

229001–229100 

|-bgcolor=#d6d6d6
| 229001 ||  || — || November 26, 2003 || Kitt Peak || Spacewatch || — || align=right | 4.4 km || 
|-id=002 bgcolor=#d6d6d6
| 229002 ||  || — || November 19, 2003 || Palomar || NEAT || Tj (2.99) || align=right | 6.0 km || 
|-id=003 bgcolor=#d6d6d6
| 229003 ||  || — || November 21, 2003 || Palomar || NEAT || — || align=right | 6.6 km || 
|-id=004 bgcolor=#d6d6d6
| 229004 ||  || — || November 20, 2003 || Kitt Peak || M. W. Buie || HYG || align=right | 3.1 km || 
|-id=005 bgcolor=#d6d6d6
| 229005 ||  || — || November 19, 2003 || Palomar || NEAT || — || align=right | 7.4 km || 
|-id=006 bgcolor=#d6d6d6
| 229006 ||  || — || November 18, 2003 || Palomar || NEAT || — || align=right | 4.5 km || 
|-id=007 bgcolor=#FFC2E0
| 229007 ||  || — || December 13, 2003 || Socorro || LINEAR || APO +1km || align=right | 1.5 km || 
|-id=008 bgcolor=#d6d6d6
| 229008 ||  || — || December 12, 2003 || Palomar || NEAT || — || align=right | 4.9 km || 
|-id=009 bgcolor=#d6d6d6
| 229009 ||  || — || December 4, 2003 || Socorro || LINEAR || — || align=right | 5.8 km || 
|-id=010 bgcolor=#d6d6d6
| 229010 ||  || — || December 1, 2003 || Socorro || LINEAR || — || align=right | 4.4 km || 
|-id=011 bgcolor=#fefefe
| 229011 || 2003 YF || — || December 16, 2003 || Socorro || LINEAR || H || align=right | 1.1 km || 
|-id=012 bgcolor=#d6d6d6
| 229012 ||  || — || December 17, 2003 || Socorro || LINEAR || THB || align=right | 5.0 km || 
|-id=013 bgcolor=#d6d6d6
| 229013 ||  || — || December 17, 2003 || Socorro || LINEAR || — || align=right | 4.6 km || 
|-id=014 bgcolor=#d6d6d6
| 229014 ||  || — || December 17, 2003 || Kitt Peak || Spacewatch || — || align=right | 6.3 km || 
|-id=015 bgcolor=#d6d6d6
| 229015 ||  || — || December 17, 2003 || Socorro || LINEAR || — || align=right | 5.1 km || 
|-id=016 bgcolor=#d6d6d6
| 229016 ||  || — || December 18, 2003 || Socorro || LINEAR || — || align=right | 4.7 km || 
|-id=017 bgcolor=#d6d6d6
| 229017 ||  || — || December 19, 2003 || Socorro || LINEAR || HYG || align=right | 5.0 km || 
|-id=018 bgcolor=#d6d6d6
| 229018 ||  || — || December 19, 2003 || Socorro || LINEAR || — || align=right | 7.3 km || 
|-id=019 bgcolor=#d6d6d6
| 229019 ||  || — || December 19, 2003 || Socorro || LINEAR || TIR || align=right | 3.4 km || 
|-id=020 bgcolor=#fefefe
| 229020 ||  || — || December 19, 2003 || Socorro || LINEAR || — || align=right | 1.1 km || 
|-id=021 bgcolor=#d6d6d6
| 229021 ||  || — || December 21, 2003 || Catalina || CSS || — || align=right | 6.2 km || 
|-id=022 bgcolor=#d6d6d6
| 229022 ||  || — || December 19, 2003 || Socorro || LINEAR || MEL || align=right | 6.5 km || 
|-id=023 bgcolor=#d6d6d6
| 229023 ||  || — || December 17, 2003 || Kitt Peak || Spacewatch || EUP || align=right | 5.1 km || 
|-id=024 bgcolor=#d6d6d6
| 229024 ||  || — || December 17, 2003 || Kitt Peak || Spacewatch || — || align=right | 4.7 km || 
|-id=025 bgcolor=#fefefe
| 229025 ||  || — || January 17, 2004 || Palomar || NEAT || — || align=right data-sort-value="0.89" | 890 m || 
|-id=026 bgcolor=#fefefe
| 229026 ||  || — || January 19, 2004 || Kitt Peak || Spacewatch || — || align=right data-sort-value="0.74" | 740 m || 
|-id=027 bgcolor=#d6d6d6
| 229027 ||  || — || January 21, 2004 || Socorro || LINEAR || — || align=right | 6.0 km || 
|-id=028 bgcolor=#fefefe
| 229028 ||  || — || February 10, 2004 || Palomar || NEAT || — || align=right | 1.2 km || 
|-id=029 bgcolor=#fefefe
| 229029 ||  || — || February 13, 2004 || Kitt Peak || Spacewatch || FLO || align=right | 1.3 km || 
|-id=030 bgcolor=#d6d6d6
| 229030 ||  || — || February 10, 2004 || Palomar || NEAT || — || align=right | 5.6 km || 
|-id=031 bgcolor=#fefefe
| 229031 ||  || — || February 18, 2004 || Socorro || LINEAR || — || align=right | 1.6 km || 
|-id=032 bgcolor=#d6d6d6
| 229032 ||  || — || February 18, 2004 || Kvistaberg || UDAS || HYG || align=right | 4.0 km || 
|-id=033 bgcolor=#fefefe
| 229033 ||  || — || February 19, 2004 || Socorro || LINEAR || FLO || align=right | 1.1 km || 
|-id=034 bgcolor=#fefefe
| 229034 ||  || — || February 26, 2004 || Socorro || LINEAR || — || align=right data-sort-value="0.90" | 900 m || 
|-id=035 bgcolor=#d6d6d6
| 229035 ||  || — || March 10, 2004 || Palomar || NEAT || — || align=right | 5.9 km || 
|-id=036 bgcolor=#fefefe
| 229036 ||  || — || March 14, 2004 || Palomar || NEAT || FLO || align=right data-sort-value="0.85" | 850 m || 
|-id=037 bgcolor=#E9E9E9
| 229037 ||  || — || March 12, 2004 || Palomar || NEAT || — || align=right | 2.1 km || 
|-id=038 bgcolor=#fefefe
| 229038 ||  || — || March 13, 2004 || Palomar || NEAT || FLO || align=right data-sort-value="0.91" | 910 m || 
|-id=039 bgcolor=#fefefe
| 229039 ||  || — || March 15, 2004 || Catalina || CSS || — || align=right | 1.0 km || 
|-id=040 bgcolor=#fefefe
| 229040 ||  || — || March 15, 2004 || Catalina || CSS || — || align=right | 1.1 km || 
|-id=041 bgcolor=#fefefe
| 229041 ||  || — || March 15, 2004 || Kitt Peak || Spacewatch || FLO || align=right data-sort-value="0.92" | 920 m || 
|-id=042 bgcolor=#fefefe
| 229042 ||  || — || March 15, 2004 || Kitt Peak || Spacewatch || KLI || align=right | 2.9 km || 
|-id=043 bgcolor=#fefefe
| 229043 ||  || — || March 15, 2004 || Kitt Peak || Spacewatch || — || align=right data-sort-value="0.80" | 800 m || 
|-id=044 bgcolor=#fefefe
| 229044 ||  || — || March 16, 2004 || Socorro || LINEAR || V || align=right | 1.2 km || 
|-id=045 bgcolor=#fefefe
| 229045 ||  || — || March 16, 2004 || Catalina || CSS || FLO || align=right data-sort-value="0.88" | 880 m || 
|-id=046 bgcolor=#fefefe
| 229046 ||  || — || March 17, 2004 || Kitt Peak || Spacewatch || V || align=right data-sort-value="0.92" | 920 m || 
|-id=047 bgcolor=#fefefe
| 229047 ||  || — || March 18, 2004 || Kitt Peak || Spacewatch || MAS || align=right | 1.0 km || 
|-id=048 bgcolor=#fefefe
| 229048 ||  || — || March 16, 2004 || Socorro || LINEAR || — || align=right | 1.0 km || 
|-id=049 bgcolor=#fefefe
| 229049 ||  || — || March 16, 2004 || Socorro || LINEAR || NYS || align=right data-sort-value="0.86" | 860 m || 
|-id=050 bgcolor=#d6d6d6
| 229050 ||  || — || March 17, 2004 || Kitt Peak || Spacewatch || HIL3:2 || align=right | 7.8 km || 
|-id=051 bgcolor=#fefefe
| 229051 ||  || — || March 18, 2004 || Kitt Peak || Spacewatch || — || align=right | 1.0 km || 
|-id=052 bgcolor=#fefefe
| 229052 ||  || — || March 19, 2004 || Socorro || LINEAR || FLO || align=right data-sort-value="0.91" | 910 m || 
|-id=053 bgcolor=#fefefe
| 229053 ||  || — || March 20, 2004 || Socorro || LINEAR || — || align=right | 1.5 km || 
|-id=054 bgcolor=#fefefe
| 229054 ||  || — || March 19, 2004 || Palomar || NEAT || — || align=right | 1.1 km || 
|-id=055 bgcolor=#fefefe
| 229055 ||  || — || March 26, 2004 || Kitt Peak || Spacewatch || — || align=right data-sort-value="0.96" | 960 m || 
|-id=056 bgcolor=#fefefe
| 229056 ||  || — || March 27, 2004 || Socorro || LINEAR || — || align=right data-sort-value="0.88" | 880 m || 
|-id=057 bgcolor=#fefefe
| 229057 ||  || — || March 28, 2004 || Socorro || LINEAR || — || align=right | 1.4 km || 
|-id=058 bgcolor=#fefefe
| 229058 ||  || — || March 27, 2004 || Socorro || LINEAR || — || align=right data-sort-value="0.97" | 970 m || 
|-id=059 bgcolor=#fefefe
| 229059 ||  || — || March 20, 2004 || Kitt Peak || Spacewatch || — || align=right data-sort-value="0.78" | 780 m || 
|-id=060 bgcolor=#fefefe
| 229060 ||  || — || April 11, 2004 || Palomar || NEAT || — || align=right data-sort-value="0.90" | 900 m || 
|-id=061 bgcolor=#fefefe
| 229061 ||  || — || April 9, 2004 || Siding Spring || SSS || FLO || align=right | 1.0 km || 
|-id=062 bgcolor=#fefefe
| 229062 ||  || — || April 13, 2004 || Catalina || CSS || FLO || align=right data-sort-value="0.94" | 940 m || 
|-id=063 bgcolor=#fefefe
| 229063 ||  || — || April 15, 2004 || Anderson Mesa || LONEOS || NYS || align=right data-sort-value="0.92" | 920 m || 
|-id=064 bgcolor=#fefefe
| 229064 ||  || — || April 12, 2004 || Palomar || NEAT || FLO || align=right | 1.0 km || 
|-id=065 bgcolor=#fefefe
| 229065 ||  || — || April 12, 2004 || Kitt Peak || Spacewatch || — || align=right data-sort-value="0.87" | 870 m || 
|-id=066 bgcolor=#fefefe
| 229066 ||  || — || April 12, 2004 || Kitt Peak || Spacewatch || — || align=right | 1.3 km || 
|-id=067 bgcolor=#fefefe
| 229067 ||  || — || April 13, 2004 || Kitt Peak || Spacewatch || NYS || align=right data-sort-value="0.83" | 830 m || 
|-id=068 bgcolor=#fefefe
| 229068 ||  || — || April 13, 2004 || Kitt Peak || Spacewatch || — || align=right data-sort-value="0.91" | 910 m || 
|-id=069 bgcolor=#fefefe
| 229069 ||  || — || April 12, 2004 || Kitt Peak || Spacewatch || — || align=right data-sort-value="0.98" | 980 m || 
|-id=070 bgcolor=#fefefe
| 229070 ||  || — || April 16, 2004 || Socorro || LINEAR || FLO || align=right data-sort-value="0.90" | 900 m || 
|-id=071 bgcolor=#fefefe
| 229071 ||  || — || April 17, 2004 || Anderson Mesa || LONEOS || V || align=right | 1.1 km || 
|-id=072 bgcolor=#fefefe
| 229072 ||  || — || April 21, 2004 || Campo Imperatore || CINEOS || V || align=right data-sort-value="0.93" | 930 m || 
|-id=073 bgcolor=#fefefe
| 229073 ||  || — || April 21, 2004 || Kitt Peak || Spacewatch || — || align=right data-sort-value="0.94" | 940 m || 
|-id=074 bgcolor=#fefefe
| 229074 ||  || — || May 9, 2004 || Palomar || NEAT || ERI || align=right | 2.1 km || 
|-id=075 bgcolor=#fefefe
| 229075 ||  || — || May 13, 2004 || Kitt Peak || Spacewatch || FLO || align=right data-sort-value="0.91" | 910 m || 
|-id=076 bgcolor=#fefefe
| 229076 ||  || — || May 14, 2004 || Kitt Peak || Spacewatch || V || align=right | 1.0 km || 
|-id=077 bgcolor=#fefefe
| 229077 ||  || — || June 9, 2004 || Anderson Mesa || LONEOS || — || align=right | 1.1 km || 
|-id=078 bgcolor=#E9E9E9
| 229078 ||  || — || June 12, 2004 || Socorro || LINEAR || — || align=right | 2.2 km || 
|-id=079 bgcolor=#fefefe
| 229079 ||  || — || June 14, 2004 || Socorro || LINEAR || — || align=right | 1.3 km || 
|-id=080 bgcolor=#fefefe
| 229080 ||  || — || June 11, 2004 || Kitt Peak || Spacewatch || — || align=right | 1.4 km || 
|-id=081 bgcolor=#fefefe
| 229081 ||  || — || June 20, 2004 || Kitt Peak || Spacewatch || FLO || align=right | 1.0 km || 
|-id=082 bgcolor=#E9E9E9
| 229082 ||  || — || July 11, 2004 || Socorro || LINEAR || — || align=right | 3.8 km || 
|-id=083 bgcolor=#E9E9E9
| 229083 ||  || — || July 10, 2004 || Palomar || NEAT || — || align=right | 2.6 km || 
|-id=084 bgcolor=#E9E9E9
| 229084 ||  || — || July 11, 2004 || Socorro || LINEAR || KON || align=right | 3.8 km || 
|-id=085 bgcolor=#fefefe
| 229085 ||  || — || July 11, 2004 || Socorro || LINEAR || — || align=right | 1.1 km || 
|-id=086 bgcolor=#E9E9E9
| 229086 ||  || — || July 11, 2004 || Socorro || LINEAR || — || align=right | 1.4 km || 
|-id=087 bgcolor=#E9E9E9
| 229087 ||  || — || July 11, 2004 || Socorro || LINEAR || — || align=right | 1.4 km || 
|-id=088 bgcolor=#fefefe
| 229088 ||  || — || July 11, 2004 || Anderson Mesa || LONEOS || — || align=right | 2.9 km || 
|-id=089 bgcolor=#fefefe
| 229089 ||  || — || July 16, 2004 || Socorro || LINEAR || — || align=right | 1.7 km || 
|-id=090 bgcolor=#E9E9E9
| 229090 ||  || — || August 7, 2004 || Palomar || NEAT || — || align=right | 1.3 km || 
|-id=091 bgcolor=#fefefe
| 229091 ||  || — || August 9, 2004 || Socorro || LINEAR || V || align=right | 1.1 km || 
|-id=092 bgcolor=#E9E9E9
| 229092 ||  || — || August 13, 2004 || Palomar || NEAT || — || align=right | 2.0 km || 
|-id=093 bgcolor=#E9E9E9
| 229093 ||  || — || August 8, 2004 || Palomar || NEAT || MAR || align=right | 1.8 km || 
|-id=094 bgcolor=#E9E9E9
| 229094 ||  || — || August 19, 2004 || Siding Spring || SSS || — || align=right | 2.1 km || 
|-id=095 bgcolor=#E9E9E9
| 229095 ||  || — || August 22, 2004 || Reedy Creek || J. Broughton || — || align=right | 2.6 km || 
|-id=096 bgcolor=#E9E9E9
| 229096 ||  || — || August 22, 2004 || Bergisch Gladbach || W. Bickel || — || align=right | 3.2 km || 
|-id=097 bgcolor=#E9E9E9
| 229097 ||  || — || August 20, 2004 || Catalina || CSS || — || align=right | 5.1 km || 
|-id=098 bgcolor=#E9E9E9
| 229098 ||  || — || August 20, 2004 || Siding Spring || SSS || JUN || align=right | 1.3 km || 
|-id=099 bgcolor=#E9E9E9
| 229099 ||  || — || September 6, 2004 || Needville || Needville Obs. || NEM || align=right | 2.5 km || 
|-id=100 bgcolor=#E9E9E9
| 229100 ||  || — || September 4, 2004 || Palomar || NEAT || ADE || align=right | 2.8 km || 
|}

229101–229200 

|-bgcolor=#E9E9E9
| 229101 ||  || — || September 6, 2004 || Siding Spring || SSS || — || align=right | 2.3 km || 
|-id=102 bgcolor=#E9E9E9
| 229102 ||  || — || September 7, 2004 || Socorro || LINEAR || — || align=right | 1.9 km || 
|-id=103 bgcolor=#E9E9E9
| 229103 ||  || — || September 7, 2004 || Socorro || LINEAR || — || align=right | 2.5 km || 
|-id=104 bgcolor=#E9E9E9
| 229104 ||  || — || September 7, 2004 || Socorro || LINEAR || — || align=right | 1.3 km || 
|-id=105 bgcolor=#E9E9E9
| 229105 ||  || — || September 7, 2004 || Kitt Peak || Spacewatch || — || align=right | 2.9 km || 
|-id=106 bgcolor=#E9E9E9
| 229106 ||  || — || September 7, 2004 || Kitt Peak || Spacewatch || RAF || align=right | 1.2 km || 
|-id=107 bgcolor=#E9E9E9
| 229107 ||  || — || September 8, 2004 || Socorro || LINEAR || AEO || align=right | 1.5 km || 
|-id=108 bgcolor=#E9E9E9
| 229108 ||  || — || September 8, 2004 || Socorro || LINEAR || — || align=right | 2.1 km || 
|-id=109 bgcolor=#E9E9E9
| 229109 ||  || — || September 8, 2004 || Socorro || LINEAR || — || align=right | 1.5 km || 
|-id=110 bgcolor=#E9E9E9
| 229110 ||  || — || September 8, 2004 || Socorro || LINEAR || AEO || align=right | 1.5 km || 
|-id=111 bgcolor=#E9E9E9
| 229111 ||  || — || September 8, 2004 || Socorro || LINEAR || — || align=right | 2.0 km || 
|-id=112 bgcolor=#E9E9E9
| 229112 ||  || — || September 8, 2004 || Socorro || LINEAR || — || align=right | 2.9 km || 
|-id=113 bgcolor=#E9E9E9
| 229113 ||  || — || September 9, 2004 || Socorro || LINEAR || — || align=right | 1.5 km || 
|-id=114 bgcolor=#E9E9E9
| 229114 ||  || — || September 8, 2004 || Socorro || LINEAR || — || align=right | 3.3 km || 
|-id=115 bgcolor=#E9E9E9
| 229115 ||  || — || September 8, 2004 || Palomar || NEAT || — || align=right | 2.9 km || 
|-id=116 bgcolor=#E9E9E9
| 229116 ||  || — || September 8, 2004 || Socorro || LINEAR || — || align=right | 1.8 km || 
|-id=117 bgcolor=#E9E9E9
| 229117 ||  || — || September 8, 2004 || Socorro || LINEAR || — || align=right | 1.8 km || 
|-id=118 bgcolor=#E9E9E9
| 229118 ||  || — || September 8, 2004 || Palomar || NEAT || GEF || align=right | 1.6 km || 
|-id=119 bgcolor=#E9E9E9
| 229119 ||  || — || September 9, 2004 || Kitt Peak || Spacewatch || — || align=right | 2.0 km || 
|-id=120 bgcolor=#E9E9E9
| 229120 ||  || — || September 7, 2004 || Kitt Peak || Spacewatch || — || align=right | 1.7 km || 
|-id=121 bgcolor=#E9E9E9
| 229121 ||  || — || September 7, 2004 || Palomar || NEAT || — || align=right | 5.1 km || 
|-id=122 bgcolor=#E9E9E9
| 229122 ||  || — || September 8, 2004 || Palomar || NEAT || MAR || align=right | 2.7 km || 
|-id=123 bgcolor=#E9E9E9
| 229123 ||  || — || September 8, 2004 || Palomar || NEAT || — || align=right | 3.7 km || 
|-id=124 bgcolor=#fefefe
| 229124 ||  || — || September 10, 2004 || Socorro || LINEAR || — || align=right | 1.4 km || 
|-id=125 bgcolor=#E9E9E9
| 229125 ||  || — || September 11, 2004 || Socorro || LINEAR || — || align=right | 1.3 km || 
|-id=126 bgcolor=#E9E9E9
| 229126 ||  || — || September 10, 2004 || Socorro || LINEAR || — || align=right | 2.7 km || 
|-id=127 bgcolor=#E9E9E9
| 229127 ||  || — || September 10, 2004 || Socorro || LINEAR || — || align=right | 3.4 km || 
|-id=128 bgcolor=#E9E9E9
| 229128 ||  || — || September 10, 2004 || Socorro || LINEAR || — || align=right | 2.7 km || 
|-id=129 bgcolor=#E9E9E9
| 229129 ||  || — || September 10, 2004 || Socorro || LINEAR || — || align=right | 1.5 km || 
|-id=130 bgcolor=#E9E9E9
| 229130 ||  || — || September 10, 2004 || Socorro || LINEAR || DOR || align=right | 5.7 km || 
|-id=131 bgcolor=#E9E9E9
| 229131 ||  || — || September 10, 2004 || Socorro || LINEAR || — || align=right | 3.1 km || 
|-id=132 bgcolor=#E9E9E9
| 229132 ||  || — || September 11, 2004 || Socorro || LINEAR || ADE || align=right | 3.1 km || 
|-id=133 bgcolor=#E9E9E9
| 229133 ||  || — || September 11, 2004 || Socorro || LINEAR || — || align=right | 1.8 km || 
|-id=134 bgcolor=#E9E9E9
| 229134 ||  || — || September 11, 2004 || Socorro || LINEAR || — || align=right | 2.8 km || 
|-id=135 bgcolor=#E9E9E9
| 229135 ||  || — || September 11, 2004 || Socorro || LINEAR || — || align=right | 4.2 km || 
|-id=136 bgcolor=#E9E9E9
| 229136 ||  || — || September 9, 2004 || Kitt Peak || Spacewatch || — || align=right | 2.3 km || 
|-id=137 bgcolor=#E9E9E9
| 229137 ||  || — || September 11, 2004 || Kitt Peak || Spacewatch || — || align=right | 1.5 km || 
|-id=138 bgcolor=#E9E9E9
| 229138 ||  || — || September 15, 2004 || Socorro || LINEAR || HNS || align=right | 2.4 km || 
|-id=139 bgcolor=#d6d6d6
| 229139 ||  || — || September 10, 2004 || Socorro || LINEAR || — || align=right | 3.2 km || 
|-id=140 bgcolor=#E9E9E9
| 229140 ||  || — || September 10, 2004 || Socorro || LINEAR || — || align=right | 3.0 km || 
|-id=141 bgcolor=#E9E9E9
| 229141 ||  || — || September 11, 2004 || Kitt Peak || Spacewatch || — || align=right | 1.6 km || 
|-id=142 bgcolor=#E9E9E9
| 229142 ||  || — || September 13, 2004 || Palomar || NEAT || — || align=right | 3.5 km || 
|-id=143 bgcolor=#E9E9E9
| 229143 ||  || — || September 15, 2004 || Siding Spring || SSS || — || align=right | 3.4 km || 
|-id=144 bgcolor=#E9E9E9
| 229144 ||  || — || September 12, 2004 || Socorro || LINEAR || — || align=right | 3.6 km || 
|-id=145 bgcolor=#E9E9E9
| 229145 ||  || — || September 13, 2004 || Socorro || LINEAR || — || align=right | 4.4 km || 
|-id=146 bgcolor=#E9E9E9
| 229146 ||  || — || September 16, 2004 || Socorro || LINEAR || — || align=right | 3.3 km || 
|-id=147 bgcolor=#E9E9E9
| 229147 ||  || — || September 17, 2004 || Socorro || LINEAR || — || align=right | 2.4 km || 
|-id=148 bgcolor=#E9E9E9
| 229148 ||  || — || September 17, 2004 || Anderson Mesa || LONEOS || — || align=right | 1.7 km || 
|-id=149 bgcolor=#E9E9E9
| 229149 ||  || — || September 17, 2004 || Kitt Peak || Spacewatch || — || align=right | 2.4 km || 
|-id=150 bgcolor=#E9E9E9
| 229150 ||  || — || September 17, 2004 || Socorro || LINEAR || — || align=right | 2.4 km || 
|-id=151 bgcolor=#E9E9E9
| 229151 ||  || — || September 17, 2004 || Socorro || LINEAR || — || align=right | 3.5 km || 
|-id=152 bgcolor=#d6d6d6
| 229152 ||  || — || September 17, 2004 || Anderson Mesa || LONEOS || EOS || align=right | 2.6 km || 
|-id=153 bgcolor=#E9E9E9
| 229153 ||  || — || September 18, 2004 || Socorro || LINEAR || MRX || align=right | 1.9 km || 
|-id=154 bgcolor=#E9E9E9
| 229154 ||  || — || September 21, 2004 || Socorro || LINEAR || — || align=right | 3.0 km || 
|-id=155 bgcolor=#E9E9E9
| 229155 ||  || — || September 22, 2004 || Socorro || LINEAR || MRX || align=right | 1.8 km || 
|-id=156 bgcolor=#E9E9E9
| 229156 || 2004 TU || — || October 4, 2004 || Anderson Mesa || LONEOS || AGN || align=right | 1.8 km || 
|-id=157 bgcolor=#E9E9E9
| 229157 ||  || — || October 4, 2004 || Kitt Peak || Spacewatch || WIT || align=right | 1.5 km || 
|-id=158 bgcolor=#E9E9E9
| 229158 ||  || — || October 4, 2004 || Kitt Peak || Spacewatch || — || align=right | 3.4 km || 
|-id=159 bgcolor=#E9E9E9
| 229159 ||  || — || October 10, 2004 || Socorro || LINEAR || — || align=right | 4.2 km || 
|-id=160 bgcolor=#E9E9E9
| 229160 ||  || — || October 4, 2004 || Kitt Peak || Spacewatch || — || align=right | 1.3 km || 
|-id=161 bgcolor=#d6d6d6
| 229161 ||  || — || October 4, 2004 || Kitt Peak || Spacewatch || — || align=right | 3.4 km || 
|-id=162 bgcolor=#E9E9E9
| 229162 ||  || — || October 5, 2004 || Anderson Mesa || LONEOS || — || align=right | 3.3 km || 
|-id=163 bgcolor=#E9E9E9
| 229163 ||  || — || October 5, 2004 || Anderson Mesa || LONEOS || — || align=right | 4.5 km || 
|-id=164 bgcolor=#E9E9E9
| 229164 ||  || — || October 6, 2004 || Kitt Peak || Spacewatch || — || align=right | 2.9 km || 
|-id=165 bgcolor=#E9E9E9
| 229165 ||  || — || October 6, 2004 || Kitt Peak || Spacewatch || — || align=right | 2.3 km || 
|-id=166 bgcolor=#E9E9E9
| 229166 ||  || — || October 5, 2004 || Kitt Peak || Spacewatch || AST || align=right | 3.1 km || 
|-id=167 bgcolor=#E9E9E9
| 229167 ||  || — || October 5, 2004 || Kitt Peak || Spacewatch || — || align=right | 2.6 km || 
|-id=168 bgcolor=#E9E9E9
| 229168 ||  || — || October 7, 2004 || Socorro || LINEAR || AEO || align=right | 2.1 km || 
|-id=169 bgcolor=#E9E9E9
| 229169 ||  || — || October 7, 2004 || Socorro || LINEAR || — || align=right | 3.2 km || 
|-id=170 bgcolor=#E9E9E9
| 229170 ||  || — || October 8, 2004 || Anderson Mesa || LONEOS || — || align=right | 3.7 km || 
|-id=171 bgcolor=#E9E9E9
| 229171 ||  || — || October 8, 2004 || Anderson Mesa || LONEOS || — || align=right | 4.1 km || 
|-id=172 bgcolor=#E9E9E9
| 229172 ||  || — || October 9, 2004 || Anderson Mesa || LONEOS || — || align=right | 3.4 km || 
|-id=173 bgcolor=#E9E9E9
| 229173 ||  || — || October 5, 2004 || Kitt Peak || Spacewatch || AEO || align=right | 2.0 km || 
|-id=174 bgcolor=#E9E9E9
| 229174 ||  || — || October 6, 2004 || Kitt Peak || Spacewatch || HEN || align=right | 1.3 km || 
|-id=175 bgcolor=#E9E9E9
| 229175 ||  || — || October 6, 2004 || Kitt Peak || Spacewatch || HOF || align=right | 3.0 km || 
|-id=176 bgcolor=#E9E9E9
| 229176 ||  || — || October 6, 2004 || Kitt Peak || Spacewatch || MRX || align=right | 1.6 km || 
|-id=177 bgcolor=#E9E9E9
| 229177 ||  || — || October 6, 2004 || Kitt Peak || Spacewatch || AGN || align=right | 1.4 km || 
|-id=178 bgcolor=#E9E9E9
| 229178 ||  || — || October 6, 2004 || Kitt Peak || Spacewatch || HOF || align=right | 3.9 km || 
|-id=179 bgcolor=#E9E9E9
| 229179 ||  || — || October 7, 2004 || Kitt Peak || Spacewatch || PAD || align=right | 3.1 km || 
|-id=180 bgcolor=#E9E9E9
| 229180 ||  || — || October 7, 2004 || Kitt Peak || Spacewatch || HEN || align=right | 1.1 km || 
|-id=181 bgcolor=#E9E9E9
| 229181 ||  || — || October 7, 2004 || Kitt Peak || Spacewatch || — || align=right | 1.8 km || 
|-id=182 bgcolor=#E9E9E9
| 229182 ||  || — || October 7, 2004 || Kitt Peak || Spacewatch || HNA || align=right | 3.6 km || 
|-id=183 bgcolor=#E9E9E9
| 229183 ||  || — || October 7, 2004 || Kitt Peak || Spacewatch || HOF || align=right | 3.2 km || 
|-id=184 bgcolor=#E9E9E9
| 229184 ||  || — || October 7, 2004 || Kitt Peak || Spacewatch || HOF || align=right | 3.1 km || 
|-id=185 bgcolor=#E9E9E9
| 229185 ||  || — || October 8, 2004 || Kitt Peak || Spacewatch || NEM || align=right | 2.9 km || 
|-id=186 bgcolor=#E9E9E9
| 229186 ||  || — || October 5, 2004 || Kitt Peak || Spacewatch || — || align=right | 2.9 km || 
|-id=187 bgcolor=#E9E9E9
| 229187 ||  || — || October 5, 2004 || Kitt Peak || Spacewatch || HEN || align=right | 1.2 km || 
|-id=188 bgcolor=#E9E9E9
| 229188 ||  || — || October 7, 2004 || Socorro || LINEAR || — || align=right | 1.6 km || 
|-id=189 bgcolor=#E9E9E9
| 229189 ||  || — || October 7, 2004 || Socorro || LINEAR || — || align=right | 4.2 km || 
|-id=190 bgcolor=#E9E9E9
| 229190 ||  || — || October 8, 2004 || Kitt Peak || Spacewatch || — || align=right | 1.8 km || 
|-id=191 bgcolor=#d6d6d6
| 229191 ||  || — || October 10, 2004 || Socorro || LINEAR || TRP || align=right | 3.8 km || 
|-id=192 bgcolor=#E9E9E9
| 229192 ||  || — || October 9, 2004 || Kitt Peak || Spacewatch || AGN || align=right | 1.6 km || 
|-id=193 bgcolor=#E9E9E9
| 229193 ||  || — || October 9, 2004 || Kitt Peak || Spacewatch || — || align=right | 2.1 km || 
|-id=194 bgcolor=#E9E9E9
| 229194 ||  || — || October 10, 2004 || Kitt Peak || Spacewatch || — || align=right | 3.7 km || 
|-id=195 bgcolor=#E9E9E9
| 229195 ||  || — || October 8, 2004 || Anderson Mesa || LONEOS || DOR || align=right | 4.4 km || 
|-id=196 bgcolor=#E9E9E9
| 229196 ||  || — || October 10, 2004 || Kitt Peak || Spacewatch || — || align=right | 2.6 km || 
|-id=197 bgcolor=#E9E9E9
| 229197 ||  || — || October 15, 2004 || Anderson Mesa || LONEOS || — || align=right | 4.3 km || 
|-id=198 bgcolor=#d6d6d6
| 229198 ||  || — || October 15, 2004 || Moletai || K. Černis || — || align=right | 3.4 km || 
|-id=199 bgcolor=#E9E9E9
| 229199 ||  || — || October 7, 2004 || Kitt Peak || Spacewatch || — || align=right | 1.1 km || 
|-id=200 bgcolor=#E9E9E9
| 229200 ||  || — || October 21, 2004 || Socorro || LINEAR || — || align=right | 3.4 km || 
|}

229201–229300 

|-bgcolor=#fefefe
| 229201 ||  || — || October 21, 2004 || Socorro || LINEAR || H || align=right | 1.1 km || 
|-id=202 bgcolor=#d6d6d6
| 229202 ||  || — || November 3, 2004 || Kitt Peak || Spacewatch || — || align=right | 4.2 km || 
|-id=203 bgcolor=#E9E9E9
| 229203 ||  || — || November 3, 2004 || Kitt Peak || Spacewatch || — || align=right | 2.6 km || 
|-id=204 bgcolor=#E9E9E9
| 229204 ||  || — || November 4, 2004 || Catalina || CSS || — || align=right | 3.4 km || 
|-id=205 bgcolor=#d6d6d6
| 229205 ||  || — || November 3, 2004 || Anderson Mesa || LONEOS || — || align=right | 3.5 km || 
|-id=206 bgcolor=#d6d6d6
| 229206 ||  || — || November 4, 2004 || Anderson Mesa || LONEOS || CHA || align=right | 3.3 km || 
|-id=207 bgcolor=#E9E9E9
| 229207 ||  || — || November 3, 2004 || Kitt Peak || Spacewatch || — || align=right | 3.1 km || 
|-id=208 bgcolor=#d6d6d6
| 229208 ||  || — || November 3, 2004 || Kitt Peak || Spacewatch || KOR || align=right | 1.7 km || 
|-id=209 bgcolor=#d6d6d6
| 229209 ||  || — || November 4, 2004 || Kitt Peak || Spacewatch || — || align=right | 3.6 km || 
|-id=210 bgcolor=#E9E9E9
| 229210 ||  || — || November 4, 2004 || Catalina || CSS || — || align=right | 4.1 km || 
|-id=211 bgcolor=#d6d6d6
| 229211 ||  || — || November 5, 2004 || Socorro || LINEAR || — || align=right | 4.7 km || 
|-id=212 bgcolor=#d6d6d6
| 229212 ||  || — || November 9, 2004 || Catalina || CSS || — || align=right | 4.5 km || 
|-id=213 bgcolor=#E9E9E9
| 229213 ||  || — || November 10, 2004 || Kitt Peak || Spacewatch || — || align=right | 2.6 km || 
|-id=214 bgcolor=#d6d6d6
| 229214 ||  || — || November 9, 2004 || Kitt Peak || M. W. Buie || KOR || align=right | 1.6 km || 
|-id=215 bgcolor=#d6d6d6
| 229215 ||  || — || November 10, 2004 || Kitt Peak || Spacewatch || — || align=right | 4.1 km || 
|-id=216 bgcolor=#E9E9E9
| 229216 ||  || — || November 4, 2004 || Catalina || CSS || — || align=right | 4.2 km || 
|-id=217 bgcolor=#E9E9E9
| 229217 ||  || — || November 6, 2004 || Socorro || LINEAR || — || align=right | 1.9 km || 
|-id=218 bgcolor=#d6d6d6
| 229218 ||  || — || November 12, 2004 || Catalina || CSS || — || align=right | 3.6 km || 
|-id=219 bgcolor=#E9E9E9
| 229219 ||  || — || November 10, 2004 || Kitt Peak || Spacewatch || — || align=right | 1.9 km || 
|-id=220 bgcolor=#d6d6d6
| 229220 ||  || — || November 10, 2004 || Kitt Peak || Spacewatch || KAR || align=right | 1.4 km || 
|-id=221 bgcolor=#E9E9E9
| 229221 ||  || — || November 17, 2004 || Siding Spring || SSS || — || align=right | 2.7 km || 
|-id=222 bgcolor=#E9E9E9
| 229222 ||  || — || December 2, 2004 || Palomar || NEAT || HOF || align=right | 4.0 km || 
|-id=223 bgcolor=#d6d6d6
| 229223 ||  || — || December 2, 2004 || Catalina || CSS || — || align=right | 5.0 km || 
|-id=224 bgcolor=#d6d6d6
| 229224 ||  || — || December 2, 2004 || Catalina || CSS || — || align=right | 5.2 km || 
|-id=225 bgcolor=#d6d6d6
| 229225 ||  || — || December 10, 2004 || Desert Moon || B. L. Stevens || — || align=right | 2.8 km || 
|-id=226 bgcolor=#E9E9E9
| 229226 ||  || — || December 7, 2004 || Socorro || LINEAR || WIT || align=right | 1.6 km || 
|-id=227 bgcolor=#d6d6d6
| 229227 ||  || — || December 8, 2004 || Socorro || LINEAR || SAN || align=right | 2.9 km || 
|-id=228 bgcolor=#E9E9E9
| 229228 ||  || — || December 10, 2004 || Socorro || LINEAR || — || align=right | 3.2 km || 
|-id=229 bgcolor=#E9E9E9
| 229229 ||  || — || December 10, 2004 || Socorro || LINEAR || — || align=right | 3.2 km || 
|-id=230 bgcolor=#d6d6d6
| 229230 ||  || — || December 11, 2004 || Campo Imperatore || CINEOS || — || align=right | 3.3 km || 
|-id=231 bgcolor=#d6d6d6
| 229231 ||  || — || December 11, 2004 || Socorro || LINEAR || — || align=right | 3.3 km || 
|-id=232 bgcolor=#E9E9E9
| 229232 ||  || — || December 12, 2004 || Kitt Peak || Spacewatch || — || align=right | 2.2 km || 
|-id=233 bgcolor=#E9E9E9
| 229233 ||  || — || December 2, 2004 || Socorro || LINEAR || — || align=right | 3.8 km || 
|-id=234 bgcolor=#d6d6d6
| 229234 ||  || — || December 2, 2004 || Palomar || NEAT || KOR || align=right | 1.9 km || 
|-id=235 bgcolor=#d6d6d6
| 229235 ||  || — || December 8, 2004 || Socorro || LINEAR || — || align=right | 3.3 km || 
|-id=236 bgcolor=#d6d6d6
| 229236 ||  || — || December 10, 2004 || Kitt Peak || Spacewatch || BRA || align=right | 2.3 km || 
|-id=237 bgcolor=#E9E9E9
| 229237 ||  || — || December 10, 2004 || Socorro || LINEAR || HEN || align=right | 1.5 km || 
|-id=238 bgcolor=#d6d6d6
| 229238 ||  || — || December 10, 2004 || Socorro || LINEAR || — || align=right | 4.9 km || 
|-id=239 bgcolor=#d6d6d6
| 229239 ||  || — || December 12, 2004 || Kitt Peak || Spacewatch || HYG || align=right | 2.9 km || 
|-id=240 bgcolor=#d6d6d6
| 229240 ||  || — || December 11, 2004 || Kitt Peak || Spacewatch || — || align=right | 2.7 km || 
|-id=241 bgcolor=#E9E9E9
| 229241 ||  || — || December 10, 2004 || Kitt Peak || Spacewatch || — || align=right | 2.5 km || 
|-id=242 bgcolor=#d6d6d6
| 229242 ||  || — || December 12, 2004 || Kitt Peak || Spacewatch || — || align=right | 2.7 km || 
|-id=243 bgcolor=#E9E9E9
| 229243 ||  || — || December 9, 2004 || Catalina || CSS || NEM || align=right | 2.8 km || 
|-id=244 bgcolor=#d6d6d6
| 229244 ||  || — || December 10, 2004 || Kitt Peak || Spacewatch || — || align=right | 6.3 km || 
|-id=245 bgcolor=#d6d6d6
| 229245 ||  || — || December 10, 2004 || Socorro || LINEAR || — || align=right | 5.4 km || 
|-id=246 bgcolor=#d6d6d6
| 229246 ||  || — || December 13, 2004 || Kitt Peak || Spacewatch || — || align=right | 4.2 km || 
|-id=247 bgcolor=#d6d6d6
| 229247 ||  || — || December 11, 2004 || Socorro || LINEAR || LAU || align=right | 1.8 km || 
|-id=248 bgcolor=#d6d6d6
| 229248 ||  || — || December 15, 2004 || Socorro || LINEAR || — || align=right | 4.8 km || 
|-id=249 bgcolor=#d6d6d6
| 229249 ||  || — || December 14, 2004 || Kitt Peak || Spacewatch || — || align=right | 4.6 km || 
|-id=250 bgcolor=#d6d6d6
| 229250 ||  || — || December 9, 2004 || Catalina || CSS || — || align=right | 5.0 km || 
|-id=251 bgcolor=#E9E9E9
| 229251 ||  || — || December 2, 2004 || Catalina || CSS || — || align=right | 3.9 km || 
|-id=252 bgcolor=#d6d6d6
| 229252 ||  || — || December 16, 2004 || Kitt Peak || Spacewatch || — || align=right | 6.7 km || 
|-id=253 bgcolor=#d6d6d6
| 229253 ||  || — || December 16, 2004 || Haleakala || NEAT || — || align=right | 4.7 km || 
|-id=254 bgcolor=#d6d6d6
| 229254 ||  || — || December 18, 2004 || Mount Lemmon || Mount Lemmon Survey || — || align=right | 2.8 km || 
|-id=255 bgcolor=#d6d6d6
| 229255 Andrewelliott ||  ||  || January 4, 2005 || Great Shefford || P. Birtwhistle || KOR || align=right | 1.6 km || 
|-id=256 bgcolor=#d6d6d6
| 229256 ||  || — || January 6, 2005 || Catalina || CSS || — || align=right | 4.2 km || 
|-id=257 bgcolor=#E9E9E9
| 229257 ||  || — || January 7, 2005 || Modra || Š. Gajdoš, J. Világi || — || align=right | 3.2 km || 
|-id=258 bgcolor=#d6d6d6
| 229258 ||  || — || January 7, 2005 || Socorro || LINEAR || — || align=right | 5.3 km || 
|-id=259 bgcolor=#E9E9E9
| 229259 ||  || — || January 7, 2005 || Socorro || LINEAR || INO || align=right | 2.0 km || 
|-id=260 bgcolor=#d6d6d6
| 229260 ||  || — || January 6, 2005 || Socorro || LINEAR || FIR || align=right | 5.2 km || 
|-id=261 bgcolor=#d6d6d6
| 229261 ||  || — || January 6, 2005 || Socorro || LINEAR || HYG || align=right | 3.3 km || 
|-id=262 bgcolor=#d6d6d6
| 229262 ||  || — || January 6, 2005 || Socorro || LINEAR || — || align=right | 3.2 km || 
|-id=263 bgcolor=#d6d6d6
| 229263 ||  || — || January 6, 2005 || Catalina || CSS || HYG || align=right | 5.6 km || 
|-id=264 bgcolor=#d6d6d6
| 229264 ||  || — || January 11, 2005 || Socorro || LINEAR || KOR || align=right | 2.1 km || 
|-id=265 bgcolor=#d6d6d6
| 229265 ||  || — || January 13, 2005 || Kitt Peak || Spacewatch || EOS || align=right | 2.9 km || 
|-id=266 bgcolor=#d6d6d6
| 229266 ||  || — || January 13, 2005 || Socorro || LINEAR || EOS || align=right | 3.5 km || 
|-id=267 bgcolor=#d6d6d6
| 229267 ||  || — || January 13, 2005 || Catalina || CSS || — || align=right | 3.8 km || 
|-id=268 bgcolor=#d6d6d6
| 229268 ||  || — || January 13, 2005 || Socorro || LINEAR || EOS || align=right | 3.0 km || 
|-id=269 bgcolor=#d6d6d6
| 229269 ||  || — || January 15, 2005 || Socorro || LINEAR || EOS || align=right | 5.9 km || 
|-id=270 bgcolor=#d6d6d6
| 229270 ||  || — || January 15, 2005 || Kitt Peak || Spacewatch || — || align=right | 5.9 km || 
|-id=271 bgcolor=#d6d6d6
| 229271 ||  || — || January 13, 2005 || Catalina || CSS || — || align=right | 5.0 km || 
|-id=272 bgcolor=#d6d6d6
| 229272 ||  || — || January 13, 2005 || Anderson Mesa || LONEOS || — || align=right | 3.9 km || 
|-id=273 bgcolor=#d6d6d6
| 229273 ||  || — || January 13, 2005 || Anderson Mesa || LONEOS || — || align=right | 8.7 km || 
|-id=274 bgcolor=#d6d6d6
| 229274 ||  || — || January 15, 2005 || Kitt Peak || Spacewatch || — || align=right | 4.5 km || 
|-id=275 bgcolor=#FA8072
| 229275 ||  || — || January 15, 2005 || Catalina || CSS || H || align=right | 1.0 km || 
|-id=276 bgcolor=#d6d6d6
| 229276 ||  || — || January 15, 2005 || Anderson Mesa || LONEOS || — || align=right | 1.8 km || 
|-id=277 bgcolor=#d6d6d6
| 229277 ||  || — || January 16, 2005 || Socorro || LINEAR || HYG || align=right | 4.6 km || 
|-id=278 bgcolor=#d6d6d6
| 229278 ||  || — || January 16, 2005 || Kitt Peak || Spacewatch || EOS || align=right | 2.0 km || 
|-id=279 bgcolor=#d6d6d6
| 229279 ||  || — || January 17, 2005 || Catalina || CSS || — || align=right | 4.5 km || 
|-id=280 bgcolor=#d6d6d6
| 229280 Sica ||  ||  || January 16, 2005 || Mauna Kea || P. A. Wiegert || — || align=right | 3.0 km || 
|-id=281 bgcolor=#d6d6d6
| 229281 ||  || — || February 1, 2005 || Palomar || NEAT || — || align=right | 6.4 km || 
|-id=282 bgcolor=#fefefe
| 229282 ||  || — || February 4, 2005 || Socorro || LINEAR || H || align=right data-sort-value="0.88" | 880 m || 
|-id=283 bgcolor=#d6d6d6
| 229283 ||  || — || February 1, 2005 || Catalina || CSS || HYG || align=right | 4.6 km || 
|-id=284 bgcolor=#d6d6d6
| 229284 ||  || — || February 1, 2005 || Catalina || CSS || — || align=right | 4.2 km || 
|-id=285 bgcolor=#d6d6d6
| 229285 ||  || — || February 2, 2005 || Kitt Peak || Spacewatch || — || align=right | 3.0 km || 
|-id=286 bgcolor=#d6d6d6
| 229286 ||  || — || February 2, 2005 || Kitt Peak || Spacewatch || — || align=right | 5.2 km || 
|-id=287 bgcolor=#d6d6d6
| 229287 ||  || — || February 3, 2005 || Socorro || LINEAR || THM || align=right | 3.3 km || 
|-id=288 bgcolor=#fefefe
| 229288 ||  || — || February 4, 2005 || Socorro || LINEAR || H || align=right | 1.1 km || 
|-id=289 bgcolor=#d6d6d6
| 229289 ||  || — || February 2, 2005 || Socorro || LINEAR || — || align=right | 5.4 km || 
|-id=290 bgcolor=#d6d6d6
| 229290 ||  || — || February 5, 2005 || Antares || ARO || — || align=right | 3.2 km || 
|-id=291 bgcolor=#d6d6d6
| 229291 ||  || — || February 9, 2005 || Anderson Mesa || LONEOS || THM || align=right | 2.6 km || 
|-id=292 bgcolor=#d6d6d6
| 229292 ||  || — || February 2, 2005 || Nyukasa || Mount Nyukasa Stn. || — || align=right | 2.8 km || 
|-id=293 bgcolor=#d6d6d6
| 229293 ||  || — || February 1, 2005 || Kitt Peak || Spacewatch || THM || align=right | 3.7 km || 
|-id=294 bgcolor=#fefefe
| 229294 ||  || — || March 3, 2005 || Goodricke-Pigott || R. A. Tucker || H || align=right data-sort-value="0.84" | 840 m || 
|-id=295 bgcolor=#d6d6d6
| 229295 ||  || — || March 3, 2005 || Jarnac || Jarnac Obs. || LIX || align=right | 4.9 km || 
|-id=296 bgcolor=#d6d6d6
| 229296 ||  || — || March 1, 2005 || Kitt Peak || Spacewatch || — || align=right | 3.6 km || 
|-id=297 bgcolor=#d6d6d6
| 229297 ||  || — || March 1, 2005 || Kitt Peak || Spacewatch || — || align=right | 3.3 km || 
|-id=298 bgcolor=#d6d6d6
| 229298 ||  || — || March 3, 2005 || Catalina || CSS || THM || align=right | 3.2 km || 
|-id=299 bgcolor=#d6d6d6
| 229299 ||  || — || March 3, 2005 || Catalina || CSS || LIX || align=right | 5.3 km || 
|-id=300 bgcolor=#d6d6d6
| 229300 ||  || — || March 1, 2005 || Catalina || CSS || — || align=right | 6.1 km || 
|}

229301–229400 

|-bgcolor=#d6d6d6
| 229301 ||  || — || March 2, 2005 || Kitt Peak || Spacewatch || THM || align=right | 2.5 km || 
|-id=302 bgcolor=#d6d6d6
| 229302 ||  || — || March 3, 2005 || Catalina || CSS || — || align=right | 4.3 km || 
|-id=303 bgcolor=#d6d6d6
| 229303 ||  || — || March 3, 2005 || Catalina || CSS || — || align=right | 5.0 km || 
|-id=304 bgcolor=#fefefe
| 229304 ||  || — || March 8, 2005 || Socorro || LINEAR || H || align=right data-sort-value="0.92" | 920 m || 
|-id=305 bgcolor=#d6d6d6
| 229305 ||  || — || March 4, 2005 || Calvin-Rehoboth || Calvin–Rehoboth Obs. || — || align=right | 3.3 km || 
|-id=306 bgcolor=#d6d6d6
| 229306 ||  || — || March 3, 2005 || Catalina || CSS || — || align=right | 4.5 km || 
|-id=307 bgcolor=#fefefe
| 229307 ||  || — || March 8, 2005 || Catalina || CSS || H || align=right data-sort-value="0.77" | 770 m || 
|-id=308 bgcolor=#d6d6d6
| 229308 ||  || — || March 9, 2005 || Mount Lemmon || Mount Lemmon Survey || THM || align=right | 4.3 km || 
|-id=309 bgcolor=#fefefe
| 229309 ||  || — || March 11, 2005 || Mount Lemmon || Mount Lemmon Survey || — || align=right | 1.3 km || 
|-id=310 bgcolor=#d6d6d6
| 229310 ||  || — || March 8, 2005 || Catalina || CSS || URS || align=right | 6.3 km || 
|-id=311 bgcolor=#d6d6d6
| 229311 ||  || — || March 10, 2005 || Anderson Mesa || LONEOS || — || align=right | 4.2 km || 
|-id=312 bgcolor=#d6d6d6
| 229312 ||  || — || April 2, 2005 || Catalina || CSS || EOS || align=right | 3.9 km || 
|-id=313 bgcolor=#d6d6d6
| 229313 ||  || — || April 2, 2005 || Catalina || CSS || — || align=right | 4.0 km || 
|-id=314 bgcolor=#fefefe
| 229314 ||  || — || April 6, 2005 || Kitt Peak || Spacewatch || — || align=right data-sort-value="0.64" | 640 m || 
|-id=315 bgcolor=#fefefe
| 229315 ||  || — || April 7, 2005 || Catalina || CSS || H || align=right | 1.1 km || 
|-id=316 bgcolor=#d6d6d6
| 229316 ||  || — || May 6, 2005 || Kitt Peak || Spacewatch || EUP || align=right | 5.5 km || 
|-id=317 bgcolor=#fefefe
| 229317 ||  || — || June 28, 2005 || Palomar || NEAT || — || align=right | 1.1 km || 
|-id=318 bgcolor=#fefefe
| 229318 ||  || — || June 29, 2005 || Palomar || NEAT || — || align=right data-sort-value="0.96" | 960 m || 
|-id=319 bgcolor=#fefefe
| 229319 ||  || — || June 27, 2005 || Kitt Peak || Spacewatch || FLO || align=right data-sort-value="0.80" | 800 m || 
|-id=320 bgcolor=#fefefe
| 229320 ||  || — || June 28, 2005 || Palomar || NEAT || NYS || align=right data-sort-value="0.97" | 970 m || 
|-id=321 bgcolor=#fefefe
| 229321 ||  || — || July 2, 2005 || Catalina || CSS || — || align=right | 1.3 km || 
|-id=322 bgcolor=#fefefe
| 229322 ||  || — || July 4, 2005 || Kitt Peak || Spacewatch || — || align=right data-sort-value="0.75" | 750 m || 
|-id=323 bgcolor=#fefefe
| 229323 ||  || — || July 5, 2005 || Mount Lemmon || Mount Lemmon Survey || — || align=right data-sort-value="0.85" | 850 m || 
|-id=324 bgcolor=#fefefe
| 229324 ||  || — || July 5, 2005 || Mount Lemmon || Mount Lemmon Survey || — || align=right data-sort-value="0.74" | 740 m || 
|-id=325 bgcolor=#fefefe
| 229325 ||  || — || July 9, 2005 || Catalina || CSS || — || align=right | 1.5 km || 
|-id=326 bgcolor=#fefefe
| 229326 ||  || — || July 9, 2005 || Catalina || CSS || FLO || align=right | 1.1 km || 
|-id=327 bgcolor=#fefefe
| 229327 ||  || — || July 9, 2005 || Kitt Peak || Spacewatch || — || align=right data-sort-value="0.94" | 940 m || 
|-id=328 bgcolor=#fefefe
| 229328 ||  || — || July 7, 2005 || Kitt Peak || Spacewatch || — || align=right data-sort-value="0.89" | 890 m || 
|-id=329 bgcolor=#fefefe
| 229329 ||  || — || July 10, 2005 || Kitt Peak || Spacewatch || NYS || align=right data-sort-value="0.66" | 660 m || 
|-id=330 bgcolor=#fefefe
| 229330 || 2005 OS || — || July 17, 2005 || Palomar || NEAT || V || align=right data-sort-value="0.91" | 910 m || 
|-id=331 bgcolor=#fefefe
| 229331 ||  || — || July 29, 2005 || Palomar || NEAT || — || align=right | 2.4 km || 
|-id=332 bgcolor=#fefefe
| 229332 ||  || — || July 30, 2005 || Palomar || NEAT || FLO || align=right data-sort-value="0.76" | 760 m || 
|-id=333 bgcolor=#fefefe
| 229333 ||  || — || August 22, 2005 || Haleakala || NEAT || FLO || align=right data-sort-value="0.97" | 970 m || 
|-id=334 bgcolor=#fefefe
| 229334 ||  || — || August 24, 2005 || Haleakala || NEAT || ERI || align=right | 2.3 km || 
|-id=335 bgcolor=#fefefe
| 229335 ||  || — || August 25, 2005 || Campo Imperatore || CINEOS || V || align=right data-sort-value="0.85" | 850 m || 
|-id=336 bgcolor=#fefefe
| 229336 ||  || — || August 24, 2005 || Palomar || NEAT || MAS || align=right | 1.1 km || 
|-id=337 bgcolor=#fefefe
| 229337 ||  || — || August 24, 2005 || Palomar || NEAT || FLO || align=right | 1.0 km || 
|-id=338 bgcolor=#fefefe
| 229338 ||  || — || August 25, 2005 || Palomar || NEAT || NYS || align=right data-sort-value="0.67" | 670 m || 
|-id=339 bgcolor=#fefefe
| 229339 ||  || — || August 25, 2005 || Palomar || NEAT || — || align=right | 1.00 km || 
|-id=340 bgcolor=#fefefe
| 229340 ||  || — || August 26, 2005 || Haleakala || NEAT || FLO || align=right | 1.1 km || 
|-id=341 bgcolor=#fefefe
| 229341 ||  || — || August 25, 2005 || Palomar || NEAT || ERI || align=right | 1.6 km || 
|-id=342 bgcolor=#fefefe
| 229342 ||  || — || August 24, 2005 || Palomar || NEAT || EUT || align=right data-sort-value="0.64" | 640 m || 
|-id=343 bgcolor=#fefefe
| 229343 ||  || — || August 25, 2005 || Palomar || NEAT || NYS || align=right data-sort-value="0.88" | 880 m || 
|-id=344 bgcolor=#fefefe
| 229344 ||  || — || August 25, 2005 || Palomar || NEAT || — || align=right data-sort-value="0.93" | 930 m || 
|-id=345 bgcolor=#d6d6d6
| 229345 ||  || — || August 26, 2005 || Palomar || NEAT || — || align=right | 3.7 km || 
|-id=346 bgcolor=#fefefe
| 229346 ||  || — || August 26, 2005 || Anderson Mesa || LONEOS || NYS || align=right data-sort-value="0.87" | 870 m || 
|-id=347 bgcolor=#fefefe
| 229347 ||  || — || August 26, 2005 || Palomar || NEAT || — || align=right | 2.2 km || 
|-id=348 bgcolor=#fefefe
| 229348 ||  || — || August 26, 2005 || Palomar || NEAT || V || align=right | 1.1 km || 
|-id=349 bgcolor=#fefefe
| 229349 ||  || — || August 27, 2005 || Kitt Peak || Spacewatch || MAS || align=right | 1.2 km || 
|-id=350 bgcolor=#fefefe
| 229350 ||  || — || August 27, 2005 || Siding Spring || SSS || — || align=right | 1.2 km || 
|-id=351 bgcolor=#fefefe
| 229351 ||  || — || August 28, 2005 || Anderson Mesa || LONEOS || — || align=right | 1.0 km || 
|-id=352 bgcolor=#fefefe
| 229352 ||  || — || August 29, 2005 || Vicques || M. Ory || ERI || align=right | 1.8 km || 
|-id=353 bgcolor=#fefefe
| 229353 ||  || — || August 26, 2005 || Haleakala || NEAT || — || align=right | 1.3 km || 
|-id=354 bgcolor=#fefefe
| 229354 ||  || — || August 28, 2005 || Siding Spring || SSS || — || align=right | 1.1 km || 
|-id=355 bgcolor=#fefefe
| 229355 ||  || — || August 29, 2005 || Anderson Mesa || LONEOS || — || align=right | 1.0 km || 
|-id=356 bgcolor=#fefefe
| 229356 ||  || — || August 29, 2005 || Anderson Mesa || LONEOS || MAS || align=right | 1.0 km || 
|-id=357 bgcolor=#fefefe
| 229357 ||  || — || August 28, 2005 || Bergisch Gladbach || W. Bickel || — || align=right data-sort-value="0.90" | 900 m || 
|-id=358 bgcolor=#fefefe
| 229358 ||  || — || August 27, 2005 || Palomar || NEAT || — || align=right | 1.1 km || 
|-id=359 bgcolor=#fefefe
| 229359 ||  || — || August 27, 2005 || Palomar || NEAT || NYS || align=right data-sort-value="0.71" | 710 m || 
|-id=360 bgcolor=#fefefe
| 229360 ||  || — || August 27, 2005 || Palomar || NEAT || — || align=right data-sort-value="0.91" | 910 m || 
|-id=361 bgcolor=#fefefe
| 229361 ||  || — || August 27, 2005 || Palomar || NEAT || — || align=right data-sort-value="0.92" | 920 m || 
|-id=362 bgcolor=#fefefe
| 229362 ||  || — || August 27, 2005 || Palomar || NEAT || — || align=right | 1.3 km || 
|-id=363 bgcolor=#fefefe
| 229363 ||  || — || August 30, 2005 || Palomar || NEAT || — || align=right | 1.4 km || 
|-id=364 bgcolor=#fefefe
| 229364 ||  || — || August 29, 2005 || Palomar || NEAT || — || align=right | 1.3 km || 
|-id=365 bgcolor=#fefefe
| 229365 ||  || — || August 29, 2005 || Palomar || NEAT || — || align=right | 1.5 km || 
|-id=366 bgcolor=#fefefe
| 229366 ||  || — || August 27, 2005 || Anderson Mesa || LONEOS || — || align=right | 1.0 km || 
|-id=367 bgcolor=#fefefe
| 229367 ||  || — || August 31, 2005 || Kitt Peak || Spacewatch || NYS || align=right | 1.8 km || 
|-id=368 bgcolor=#fefefe
| 229368 ||  || — || September 5, 2005 || Wrightwood || J. W. Young || — || align=right | 1.5 km || 
|-id=369 bgcolor=#fefefe
| 229369 ||  || — || September 3, 2005 || Palomar || NEAT || — || align=right data-sort-value="0.97" | 970 m || 
|-id=370 bgcolor=#fefefe
| 229370 ||  || — || September 8, 2005 || Socorro || LINEAR || — || align=right data-sort-value="0.96" | 960 m || 
|-id=371 bgcolor=#fefefe
| 229371 ||  || — || September 8, 2005 || Socorro || LINEAR || NYS || align=right data-sort-value="0.81" | 810 m || 
|-id=372 bgcolor=#fefefe
| 229372 ||  || — || September 3, 2005 || Kingsnake || J. V. McClusky || FLO || align=right | 1.1 km || 
|-id=373 bgcolor=#fefefe
| 229373 ||  || — || September 10, 2005 || Anderson Mesa || LONEOS || — || align=right | 1.1 km || 
|-id=374 bgcolor=#fefefe
| 229374 ||  || — || September 10, 2005 || Anderson Mesa || LONEOS || — || align=right | 1.6 km || 
|-id=375 bgcolor=#fefefe
| 229375 ||  || — || September 10, 2005 || Anderson Mesa || LONEOS || — || align=right | 1.2 km || 
|-id=376 bgcolor=#fefefe
| 229376 || 2005 SP || — || September 22, 2005 || Uccle || T. Pauwels || — || align=right | 1.1 km || 
|-id=377 bgcolor=#fefefe
| 229377 ||  || — || September 23, 2005 || Kitt Peak || Spacewatch || — || align=right | 1.1 km || 
|-id=378 bgcolor=#FA8072
| 229378 ||  || — || September 25, 2005 || Catalina || CSS || — || align=right | 1.0 km || 
|-id=379 bgcolor=#fefefe
| 229379 ||  || — || September 24, 2005 || Kitt Peak || Spacewatch || — || align=right | 1.0 km || 
|-id=380 bgcolor=#E9E9E9
| 229380 ||  || — || September 23, 2005 || Kitt Peak || Spacewatch || — || align=right | 2.6 km || 
|-id=381 bgcolor=#fefefe
| 229381 ||  || — || September 25, 2005 || Catalina || CSS || V || align=right | 1.0 km || 
|-id=382 bgcolor=#fefefe
| 229382 ||  || — || September 24, 2005 || Kitt Peak || Spacewatch || — || align=right data-sort-value="0.76" | 760 m || 
|-id=383 bgcolor=#fefefe
| 229383 ||  || — || September 25, 2005 || Kitt Peak || Spacewatch || NYS || align=right data-sort-value="0.89" | 890 m || 
|-id=384 bgcolor=#fefefe
| 229384 ||  || — || September 26, 2005 || Kitt Peak || Spacewatch || NYS || align=right data-sort-value="0.95" | 950 m || 
|-id=385 bgcolor=#fefefe
| 229385 ||  || — || September 26, 2005 || Kitt Peak || Spacewatch || ERI || align=right | 1.8 km || 
|-id=386 bgcolor=#fefefe
| 229386 ||  || — || September 27, 2005 || Kitt Peak || Spacewatch || — || align=right | 1.3 km || 
|-id=387 bgcolor=#fefefe
| 229387 ||  || — || September 28, 2005 || Palomar || NEAT || MAS || align=right data-sort-value="0.93" | 930 m || 
|-id=388 bgcolor=#fefefe
| 229388 ||  || — || September 27, 2005 || Junk Bond || D. Healy || — || align=right | 1.1 km || 
|-id=389 bgcolor=#fefefe
| 229389 ||  || — || September 24, 2005 || Kitt Peak || Spacewatch || — || align=right data-sort-value="0.75" | 750 m || 
|-id=390 bgcolor=#fefefe
| 229390 ||  || — || September 24, 2005 || Anderson Mesa || LONEOS || FLO || align=right data-sort-value="0.99" | 990 m || 
|-id=391 bgcolor=#fefefe
| 229391 ||  || — || September 24, 2005 || Kitt Peak || Spacewatch || — || align=right data-sort-value="0.79" | 790 m || 
|-id=392 bgcolor=#fefefe
| 229392 ||  || — || September 25, 2005 || Kitt Peak || Spacewatch || — || align=right | 1.4 km || 
|-id=393 bgcolor=#fefefe
| 229393 ||  || — || September 28, 2005 || Palomar || NEAT || V || align=right data-sort-value="0.94" | 940 m || 
|-id=394 bgcolor=#fefefe
| 229394 ||  || — || September 29, 2005 || Anderson Mesa || LONEOS || — || align=right | 2.4 km || 
|-id=395 bgcolor=#fefefe
| 229395 ||  || — || September 29, 2005 || Anderson Mesa || LONEOS || FLO || align=right data-sort-value="0.99" | 990 m || 
|-id=396 bgcolor=#fefefe
| 229396 ||  || — || September 29, 2005 || Mount Lemmon || Mount Lemmon Survey || NYS || align=right data-sort-value="0.97" | 970 m || 
|-id=397 bgcolor=#fefefe
| 229397 ||  || — || September 29, 2005 || Anderson Mesa || LONEOS || — || align=right | 1.3 km || 
|-id=398 bgcolor=#fefefe
| 229398 ||  || — || September 25, 2005 || Kitt Peak || Spacewatch || MAS || align=right data-sort-value="0.99" | 990 m || 
|-id=399 bgcolor=#fefefe
| 229399 ||  || — || September 25, 2005 || Kitt Peak || Spacewatch || NYS || align=right | 1.0 km || 
|-id=400 bgcolor=#fefefe
| 229400 ||  || — || September 25, 2005 || Kitt Peak || Spacewatch || NYS || align=right data-sort-value="0.63" | 630 m || 
|}

229401–229500 

|-bgcolor=#E9E9E9
| 229401 ||  || — || September 25, 2005 || Palomar || NEAT || IAN || align=right | 1.1 km || 
|-id=402 bgcolor=#fefefe
| 229402 ||  || — || September 30, 2005 || Kitt Peak || Spacewatch || MAS || align=right data-sort-value="0.81" | 810 m || 
|-id=403 bgcolor=#fefefe
| 229403 ||  || — || September 30, 2005 || Socorro || LINEAR || — || align=right | 1.5 km || 
|-id=404 bgcolor=#fefefe
| 229404 ||  || — || September 30, 2005 || Anderson Mesa || LONEOS || — || align=right | 1.4 km || 
|-id=405 bgcolor=#fefefe
| 229405 ||  || — || September 30, 2005 || Catalina || CSS || — || align=right | 1.3 km || 
|-id=406 bgcolor=#fefefe
| 229406 ||  || — || September 27, 2005 || Socorro || LINEAR || — || align=right | 1.3 km || 
|-id=407 bgcolor=#fefefe
| 229407 ||  || — || September 29, 2005 || Mount Lemmon || Mount Lemmon Survey || ERI || align=right | 2.1 km || 
|-id=408 bgcolor=#fefefe
| 229408 ||  || — || September 30, 2005 || Anderson Mesa || LONEOS || — || align=right | 1.1 km || 
|-id=409 bgcolor=#fefefe
| 229409 ||  || — || September 29, 2005 || Kitt Peak || Spacewatch || — || align=right data-sort-value="0.93" | 930 m || 
|-id=410 bgcolor=#fefefe
| 229410 ||  || — || September 29, 2005 || Kitt Peak || Spacewatch || — || align=right | 1.1 km || 
|-id=411 bgcolor=#fefefe
| 229411 ||  || — || September 30, 2005 || Kitt Peak || Spacewatch || NYS || align=right data-sort-value="0.95" | 950 m || 
|-id=412 bgcolor=#fefefe
| 229412 ||  || — || September 30, 2005 || Mount Lemmon || Mount Lemmon Survey || — || align=right | 1.2 km || 
|-id=413 bgcolor=#E9E9E9
| 229413 ||  || — || September 22, 2005 || Palomar || NEAT || — || align=right | 1.7 km || 
|-id=414 bgcolor=#fefefe
| 229414 ||  || — || September 25, 2005 || Kitt Peak || Spacewatch || — || align=right data-sort-value="0.90" | 900 m || 
|-id=415 bgcolor=#fefefe
| 229415 ||  || — || September 29, 2005 || Kitt Peak || Spacewatch || — || align=right | 2.2 km || 
|-id=416 bgcolor=#fefefe
| 229416 ||  || — || October 1, 2005 || Anderson Mesa || LONEOS || — || align=right | 1.2 km || 
|-id=417 bgcolor=#fefefe
| 229417 ||  || — || October 2, 2005 || Palomar || NEAT || — || align=right | 1.7 km || 
|-id=418 bgcolor=#fefefe
| 229418 ||  || — || October 2, 2005 || Mount Lemmon || Mount Lemmon Survey || NYS || align=right data-sort-value="0.70" | 700 m || 
|-id=419 bgcolor=#fefefe
| 229419 ||  || — || October 1, 2005 || Socorro || LINEAR || NYS || align=right | 1.0 km || 
|-id=420 bgcolor=#fefefe
| 229420 ||  || — || October 1, 2005 || Anderson Mesa || LONEOS || — || align=right | 1.4 km || 
|-id=421 bgcolor=#fefefe
| 229421 ||  || — || October 1, 2005 || Mount Lemmon || Mount Lemmon Survey || NYS || align=right data-sort-value="0.78" | 780 m || 
|-id=422 bgcolor=#fefefe
| 229422 ||  || — || October 1, 2005 || Kitt Peak || Spacewatch || NYS || align=right data-sort-value="0.82" | 820 m || 
|-id=423 bgcolor=#E9E9E9
| 229423 ||  || — || October 2, 2005 || Kitt Peak || Spacewatch || — || align=right | 1.6 km || 
|-id=424 bgcolor=#fefefe
| 229424 ||  || — || October 8, 2005 || Goodricke-Pigott || R. A. Tucker || NYS || align=right data-sort-value="0.95" | 950 m || 
|-id=425 bgcolor=#E9E9E9
| 229425 Grosspointner ||  ||  || October 11, 2005 || Altschwendt || W. Ries || — || align=right | 1.8 km || 
|-id=426 bgcolor=#E9E9E9
| 229426 ||  || — || October 1, 2005 || Kitt Peak || Spacewatch || — || align=right | 1.5 km || 
|-id=427 bgcolor=#fefefe
| 229427 ||  || — || October 10, 2005 || Moletai || K. Černis, J. Zdanavičius || — || align=right | 1.4 km || 
|-id=428 bgcolor=#fefefe
| 229428 ||  || — || October 1, 2005 || Catalina || CSS || NYS || align=right | 1.0 km || 
|-id=429 bgcolor=#fefefe
| 229429 ||  || — || October 3, 2005 || Catalina || CSS || — || align=right | 1.2 km || 
|-id=430 bgcolor=#fefefe
| 229430 ||  || — || October 7, 2005 || Socorro || LINEAR || NYS || align=right data-sort-value="0.79" | 790 m || 
|-id=431 bgcolor=#fefefe
| 229431 ||  || — || October 9, 2005 || Kitt Peak || Spacewatch || — || align=right | 1.2 km || 
|-id=432 bgcolor=#fefefe
| 229432 ||  || — || October 4, 2005 || Mount Lemmon || Mount Lemmon Survey || MAS || align=right data-sort-value="0.78" | 780 m || 
|-id=433 bgcolor=#fefefe
| 229433 ||  || — || October 7, 2005 || Catalina || CSS || — || align=right | 1.00 km || 
|-id=434 bgcolor=#fefefe
| 229434 ||  || — || October 8, 2005 || Kitt Peak || Spacewatch || — || align=right data-sort-value="0.88" | 880 m || 
|-id=435 bgcolor=#fefefe
| 229435 ||  || — || October 9, 2005 || Kitt Peak || Spacewatch || — || align=right | 1.4 km || 
|-id=436 bgcolor=#fefefe
| 229436 ||  || — || October 9, 2005 || Kitt Peak || Spacewatch || — || align=right data-sort-value="0.87" | 870 m || 
|-id=437 bgcolor=#fefefe
| 229437 ||  || — || October 8, 2005 || Socorro || LINEAR || ERI || align=right | 2.3 km || 
|-id=438 bgcolor=#fefefe
| 229438 ||  || — || October 10, 2005 || Catalina || CSS || V || align=right data-sort-value="0.97" | 970 m || 
|-id=439 bgcolor=#E9E9E9
| 229439 ||  || — || October 6, 2005 || Mount Lemmon || Mount Lemmon Survey || — || align=right | 2.7 km || 
|-id=440 bgcolor=#E9E9E9
| 229440 Filimon ||  ||  || October 27, 2005 || Altschwendt || W. Ries || HNS || align=right | 2.3 km || 
|-id=441 bgcolor=#fefefe
| 229441 ||  || — || October 27, 2005 || Ottmarsheim || C. Rinner || NYSfast? || align=right data-sort-value="0.99" | 990 m || 
|-id=442 bgcolor=#fefefe
| 229442 ||  || — || October 22, 2005 || Kitt Peak || Spacewatch || MAS || align=right | 1.0 km || 
|-id=443 bgcolor=#fefefe
| 229443 ||  || — || October 23, 2005 || Catalina || CSS || — || align=right | 1.0 km || 
|-id=444 bgcolor=#E9E9E9
| 229444 ||  || — || October 23, 2005 || Catalina || CSS || — || align=right | 2.3 km || 
|-id=445 bgcolor=#E9E9E9
| 229445 ||  || — || October 24, 2005 || Palomar || NEAT || BRG || align=right | 2.2 km || 
|-id=446 bgcolor=#fefefe
| 229446 ||  || — || October 23, 2005 || Catalina || CSS || V || align=right | 1.1 km || 
|-id=447 bgcolor=#fefefe
| 229447 ||  || — || October 23, 2005 || Catalina || CSS || — || align=right | 1.5 km || 
|-id=448 bgcolor=#fefefe
| 229448 ||  || — || October 22, 2005 || Kitt Peak || Spacewatch || KLI || align=right | 2.4 km || 
|-id=449 bgcolor=#fefefe
| 229449 ||  || — || October 22, 2005 || Kitt Peak || Spacewatch || NYS || align=right | 1.1 km || 
|-id=450 bgcolor=#fefefe
| 229450 ||  || — || October 23, 2005 || Kitt Peak || Spacewatch || — || align=right data-sort-value="0.87" | 870 m || 
|-id=451 bgcolor=#fefefe
| 229451 ||  || — || October 26, 2005 || Kitt Peak || Spacewatch || — || align=right | 1.2 km || 
|-id=452 bgcolor=#fefefe
| 229452 ||  || — || October 25, 2005 || Kitt Peak || Spacewatch || MAS || align=right | 1.1 km || 
|-id=453 bgcolor=#fefefe
| 229453 ||  || — || October 27, 2005 || Anderson Mesa || LONEOS || V || align=right | 1.2 km || 
|-id=454 bgcolor=#fefefe
| 229454 ||  || — || October 27, 2005 || Anderson Mesa || LONEOS || — || align=right | 1.4 km || 
|-id=455 bgcolor=#E9E9E9
| 229455 ||  || — || October 24, 2005 || Kitt Peak || Spacewatch || MAR || align=right | 1.5 km || 
|-id=456 bgcolor=#fefefe
| 229456 ||  || — || October 27, 2005 || Mount Lemmon || Mount Lemmon Survey || NYS || align=right data-sort-value="0.83" | 830 m || 
|-id=457 bgcolor=#fefefe
| 229457 ||  || — || October 27, 2005 || Mount Lemmon || Mount Lemmon Survey || NYS || align=right data-sort-value="0.84" | 840 m || 
|-id=458 bgcolor=#fefefe
| 229458 ||  || — || October 24, 2005 || Kitt Peak || Spacewatch || — || align=right | 1.1 km || 
|-id=459 bgcolor=#fefefe
| 229459 ||  || — || October 24, 2005 || Kitt Peak || Spacewatch || NYS || align=right data-sort-value="0.95" | 950 m || 
|-id=460 bgcolor=#fefefe
| 229460 ||  || — || October 24, 2005 || Kitt Peak || Spacewatch || MAS || align=right data-sort-value="0.85" | 850 m || 
|-id=461 bgcolor=#fefefe
| 229461 ||  || — || October 27, 2005 || Kitt Peak || Spacewatch || NYS || align=right data-sort-value="0.92" | 920 m || 
|-id=462 bgcolor=#fefefe
| 229462 ||  || — || October 22, 2005 || Kitt Peak || Spacewatch || — || align=right data-sort-value="0.92" | 920 m || 
|-id=463 bgcolor=#fefefe
| 229463 ||  || — || October 25, 2005 || Kitt Peak || Spacewatch || NYS || align=right data-sort-value="0.73" | 730 m || 
|-id=464 bgcolor=#fefefe
| 229464 ||  || — || October 25, 2005 || Kitt Peak || Spacewatch || — || align=right | 1.1 km || 
|-id=465 bgcolor=#fefefe
| 229465 ||  || — || October 23, 2005 || Palomar || NEAT || — || align=right | 1.0 km || 
|-id=466 bgcolor=#E9E9E9
| 229466 ||  || — || October 26, 2005 || Kitt Peak || Spacewatch || WIT || align=right | 1.4 km || 
|-id=467 bgcolor=#fefefe
| 229467 ||  || — || October 26, 2005 || Anderson Mesa || LONEOS || V || align=right | 1.1 km || 
|-id=468 bgcolor=#fefefe
| 229468 ||  || — || October 27, 2005 || Kitt Peak || Spacewatch || MAS || align=right data-sort-value="0.92" | 920 m || 
|-id=469 bgcolor=#E9E9E9
| 229469 ||  || — || October 28, 2005 || Kitt Peak || Spacewatch || RAF || align=right data-sort-value="0.97" | 970 m || 
|-id=470 bgcolor=#fefefe
| 229470 ||  || — || October 27, 2005 || Kitt Peak || Spacewatch || — || align=right data-sort-value="0.83" | 830 m || 
|-id=471 bgcolor=#fefefe
| 229471 ||  || — || October 28, 2005 || Kitt Peak || Spacewatch || — || align=right data-sort-value="0.78" | 780 m || 
|-id=472 bgcolor=#E9E9E9
| 229472 ||  || — || October 28, 2005 || Mount Lemmon || Mount Lemmon Survey || BAR || align=right | 1.9 km || 
|-id=473 bgcolor=#fefefe
| 229473 ||  || — || October 24, 2005 || Kitt Peak || Spacewatch || FLO || align=right | 1.0 km || 
|-id=474 bgcolor=#fefefe
| 229474 ||  || — || October 26, 2005 || Kitt Peak || Spacewatch || NYS || align=right data-sort-value="0.76" | 760 m || 
|-id=475 bgcolor=#fefefe
| 229475 ||  || — || October 26, 2005 || Kitt Peak || Spacewatch || FLO || align=right data-sort-value="0.89" | 890 m || 
|-id=476 bgcolor=#E9E9E9
| 229476 ||  || — || October 26, 2005 || Kitt Peak || Spacewatch || — || align=right | 1.3 km || 
|-id=477 bgcolor=#E9E9E9
| 229477 ||  || — || October 26, 2005 || Kitt Peak || Spacewatch || — || align=right | 3.2 km || 
|-id=478 bgcolor=#fefefe
| 229478 ||  || — || October 26, 2005 || Kitt Peak || Spacewatch || — || align=right | 1.8 km || 
|-id=479 bgcolor=#E9E9E9
| 229479 ||  || — || October 26, 2005 || Kitt Peak || Spacewatch || — || align=right | 1.2 km || 
|-id=480 bgcolor=#fefefe
| 229480 ||  || — || October 27, 2005 || Kitt Peak || Spacewatch || NYS || align=right | 1.00 km || 
|-id=481 bgcolor=#fefefe
| 229481 ||  || — || October 28, 2005 || Catalina || CSS || MAS || align=right data-sort-value="0.88" | 880 m || 
|-id=482 bgcolor=#fefefe
| 229482 ||  || — || October 31, 2005 || Kitt Peak || Spacewatch || MAS || align=right data-sort-value="0.91" | 910 m || 
|-id=483 bgcolor=#fefefe
| 229483 ||  || — || October 27, 2005 || Catalina || CSS || NYS || align=right data-sort-value="0.78" | 780 m || 
|-id=484 bgcolor=#fefefe
| 229484 ||  || — || October 27, 2005 || Kitt Peak || Spacewatch || MAS || align=right | 1.00 km || 
|-id=485 bgcolor=#fefefe
| 229485 ||  || — || October 30, 2005 || Anderson Mesa || LONEOS || CHL || align=right | 2.1 km || 
|-id=486 bgcolor=#fefefe
| 229486 ||  || — || October 30, 2005 || Mount Lemmon || Mount Lemmon Survey || — || align=right | 1.2 km || 
|-id=487 bgcolor=#fefefe
| 229487 ||  || — || October 29, 2005 || Mount Lemmon || Mount Lemmon Survey || MAS || align=right data-sort-value="0.97" | 970 m || 
|-id=488 bgcolor=#E9E9E9
| 229488 ||  || — || October 28, 2005 || Socorro || LINEAR || — || align=right | 2.5 km || 
|-id=489 bgcolor=#fefefe
| 229489 ||  || — || October 31, 2005 || Mount Lemmon || Mount Lemmon Survey || — || align=right | 1.1 km || 
|-id=490 bgcolor=#E9E9E9
| 229490 ||  || — || October 28, 2005 || Mount Lemmon || Mount Lemmon Survey || — || align=right | 4.5 km || 
|-id=491 bgcolor=#fefefe
| 229491 ||  || — || October 30, 2005 || Catalina || CSS || — || align=right | 2.7 km || 
|-id=492 bgcolor=#E9E9E9
| 229492 ||  || — || October 29, 2005 || Kitt Peak || Spacewatch || — || align=right | 3.3 km || 
|-id=493 bgcolor=#fefefe
| 229493 ||  || — || October 22, 2005 || Catalina || CSS || V || align=right | 1.1 km || 
|-id=494 bgcolor=#fefefe
| 229494 ||  || — || October 27, 2005 || Catalina || CSS || — || align=right | 1.1 km || 
|-id=495 bgcolor=#E9E9E9
| 229495 ||  || — || October 24, 2005 || Mauna Kea || D. J. Tholen || — || align=right | 2.9 km || 
|-id=496 bgcolor=#fefefe
| 229496 ||  || — || October 27, 2005 || Mount Lemmon || Mount Lemmon Survey || — || align=right | 1.9 km || 
|-id=497 bgcolor=#fefefe
| 229497 ||  || — || November 6, 2005 || Nogales || M. Ory || MAS || align=right data-sort-value="0.83" | 830 m || 
|-id=498 bgcolor=#fefefe
| 229498 ||  || — || November 3, 2005 || Catalina || CSS || — || align=right | 1.2 km || 
|-id=499 bgcolor=#E9E9E9
| 229499 ||  || — || November 5, 2005 || Kitt Peak || Spacewatch || — || align=right | 1.7 km || 
|-id=500 bgcolor=#fefefe
| 229500 ||  || — || November 3, 2005 || Catalina || CSS || — || align=right | 1.3 km || 
|}

229501–229600 

|-bgcolor=#E9E9E9
| 229501 ||  || — || November 4, 2005 || Catalina || CSS || — || align=right | 2.0 km || 
|-id=502 bgcolor=#fefefe
| 229502 ||  || — || November 5, 2005 || Catalina || CSS || V || align=right data-sort-value="0.89" | 890 m || 
|-id=503 bgcolor=#fefefe
| 229503 ||  || — || November 19, 2005 || Palomar || NEAT || — || align=right | 1.2 km || 
|-id=504 bgcolor=#E9E9E9
| 229504 ||  || — || November 23, 2005 || Ottmarsheim || C. Rinner || — || align=right | 1.3 km || 
|-id=505 bgcolor=#E9E9E9
| 229505 ||  || — || November 22, 2005 || Kitt Peak || Spacewatch || — || align=right | 1.2 km || 
|-id=506 bgcolor=#E9E9E9
| 229506 ||  || — || November 25, 2005 || Mount Lemmon || Mount Lemmon Survey || — || align=right | 1.8 km || 
|-id=507 bgcolor=#fefefe
| 229507 ||  || — || November 22, 2005 || Catalina || CSS || — || align=right | 1.8 km || 
|-id=508 bgcolor=#fefefe
| 229508 ||  || — || November 25, 2005 || Kitt Peak || Spacewatch || V || align=right data-sort-value="0.98" | 980 m || 
|-id=509 bgcolor=#E9E9E9
| 229509 ||  || — || November 28, 2005 || Mount Lemmon || Mount Lemmon Survey || ADE || align=right | 3.4 km || 
|-id=510 bgcolor=#E9E9E9
| 229510 ||  || — || November 28, 2005 || Mount Lemmon || Mount Lemmon Survey || — || align=right | 2.4 km || 
|-id=511 bgcolor=#E9E9E9
| 229511 ||  || — || November 26, 2005 || Kitt Peak || Spacewatch || — || align=right | 2.7 km || 
|-id=512 bgcolor=#E9E9E9
| 229512 ||  || — || November 28, 2005 || Kitt Peak || Spacewatch || — || align=right | 2.1 km || 
|-id=513 bgcolor=#fefefe
| 229513 ||  || — || November 25, 2005 || Mount Lemmon || Mount Lemmon Survey || MAS || align=right data-sort-value="0.94" | 940 m || 
|-id=514 bgcolor=#E9E9E9
| 229514 ||  || — || November 26, 2005 || Kitt Peak || Spacewatch || — || align=right | 2.7 km || 
|-id=515 bgcolor=#E9E9E9
| 229515 ||  || — || November 29, 2005 || Socorro || LINEAR || JUN || align=right | 2.1 km || 
|-id=516 bgcolor=#fefefe
| 229516 ||  || — || November 30, 2005 || Kitt Peak || Spacewatch || NYS || align=right data-sort-value="0.84" | 840 m || 
|-id=517 bgcolor=#E9E9E9
| 229517 ||  || — || November 30, 2005 || Kitt Peak || Spacewatch || — || align=right | 1.3 km || 
|-id=518 bgcolor=#E9E9E9
| 229518 ||  || — || November 30, 2005 || Socorro || LINEAR || EUN || align=right | 1.8 km || 
|-id=519 bgcolor=#E9E9E9
| 229519 ||  || — || November 30, 2005 || Mount Lemmon || Mount Lemmon Survey || — || align=right | 2.4 km || 
|-id=520 bgcolor=#E9E9E9
| 229520 ||  || — || November 30, 2005 || Socorro || LINEAR || GEF || align=right | 1.8 km || 
|-id=521 bgcolor=#E9E9E9
| 229521 ||  || — || November 30, 2005 || Socorro || LINEAR || — || align=right | 1.3 km || 
|-id=522 bgcolor=#E9E9E9
| 229522 ||  || — || December 1, 2005 || Kitt Peak || Spacewatch || — || align=right | 2.4 km || 
|-id=523 bgcolor=#E9E9E9
| 229523 ||  || — || December 4, 2005 || Socorro || LINEAR || — || align=right | 2.6 km || 
|-id=524 bgcolor=#fefefe
| 229524 ||  || — || December 1, 2005 || Kitt Peak || Spacewatch || NYS || align=right | 1.1 km || 
|-id=525 bgcolor=#E9E9E9
| 229525 ||  || — || December 1, 2005 || Kitt Peak || Spacewatch || ADE || align=right | 2.8 km || 
|-id=526 bgcolor=#E9E9E9
| 229526 ||  || — || December 2, 2005 || Kitt Peak || Spacewatch || — || align=right | 1.3 km || 
|-id=527 bgcolor=#fefefe
| 229527 ||  || — || December 2, 2005 || Mount Lemmon || Mount Lemmon Survey || — || align=right | 1.4 km || 
|-id=528 bgcolor=#E9E9E9
| 229528 ||  || — || December 4, 2005 || Kitt Peak || Spacewatch || — || align=right | 2.9 km || 
|-id=529 bgcolor=#E9E9E9
| 229529 ||  || — || December 2, 2005 || Kitt Peak || Spacewatch || — || align=right | 2.3 km || 
|-id=530 bgcolor=#E9E9E9
| 229530 ||  || — || December 5, 2005 || Kitt Peak || Spacewatch || — || align=right | 3.6 km || 
|-id=531 bgcolor=#E9E9E9
| 229531 ||  || — || December 5, 2005 || Catalina || CSS || EUN || align=right | 2.3 km || 
|-id=532 bgcolor=#E9E9E9
| 229532 ||  || — || December 24, 2005 || Palomar || NEAT || — || align=right | 2.1 km || 
|-id=533 bgcolor=#E9E9E9
| 229533 ||  || — || December 24, 2005 || Kitt Peak || Spacewatch || — || align=right | 2.7 km || 
|-id=534 bgcolor=#E9E9E9
| 229534 ||  || — || December 25, 2005 || Kitt Peak || Spacewatch || — || align=right | 3.3 km || 
|-id=535 bgcolor=#E9E9E9
| 229535 ||  || — || December 25, 2005 || Kitt Peak || Spacewatch || — || align=right | 2.6 km || 
|-id=536 bgcolor=#E9E9E9
| 229536 ||  || — || December 26, 2005 || 7300 Observatory || W. K. Y. Yeung || — || align=right | 1.6 km || 
|-id=537 bgcolor=#E9E9E9
| 229537 ||  || — || December 24, 2005 || Kitt Peak || Spacewatch || — || align=right | 2.1 km || 
|-id=538 bgcolor=#E9E9E9
| 229538 ||  || — || December 24, 2005 || Kitt Peak || Spacewatch || — || align=right | 1.7 km || 
|-id=539 bgcolor=#E9E9E9
| 229539 ||  || — || December 24, 2005 || Kitt Peak || Spacewatch || — || align=right | 1.5 km || 
|-id=540 bgcolor=#E9E9E9
| 229540 ||  || — || December 25, 2005 || Mount Lemmon || Mount Lemmon Survey || — || align=right | 1.9 km || 
|-id=541 bgcolor=#E9E9E9
| 229541 ||  || — || December 25, 2005 || Kitt Peak || Spacewatch || — || align=right | 1.7 km || 
|-id=542 bgcolor=#E9E9E9
| 229542 ||  || — || December 25, 2005 || Kitt Peak || Spacewatch || PAD || align=right | 3.3 km || 
|-id=543 bgcolor=#E9E9E9
| 229543 ||  || — || December 25, 2005 || Kitt Peak || Spacewatch || — || align=right | 1.9 km || 
|-id=544 bgcolor=#E9E9E9
| 229544 ||  || — || December 25, 2005 || Kitt Peak || Spacewatch || — || align=right | 3.2 km || 
|-id=545 bgcolor=#E9E9E9
| 229545 ||  || — || December 28, 2005 || Socorro || LINEAR || ADE || align=right | 3.3 km || 
|-id=546 bgcolor=#E9E9E9
| 229546 ||  || — || December 26, 2005 || Kitt Peak || Spacewatch || — || align=right | 2.1 km || 
|-id=547 bgcolor=#E9E9E9
| 229547 ||  || — || December 26, 2005 || Kitt Peak || Spacewatch || — || align=right | 1.5 km || 
|-id=548 bgcolor=#E9E9E9
| 229548 ||  || — || December 28, 2005 || Mount Lemmon || Mount Lemmon Survey || NEM || align=right | 3.2 km || 
|-id=549 bgcolor=#E9E9E9
| 229549 ||  || — || December 25, 2005 || Kitt Peak || Spacewatch || — || align=right | 1.9 km || 
|-id=550 bgcolor=#E9E9E9
| 229550 ||  || — || December 27, 2005 || Mount Lemmon || Mount Lemmon Survey || — || align=right | 1.6 km || 
|-id=551 bgcolor=#E9E9E9
| 229551 ||  || — || December 24, 2005 || Catalina || CSS || EUN || align=right | 2.0 km || 
|-id=552 bgcolor=#E9E9E9
| 229552 ||  || — || December 29, 2005 || Kitt Peak || Spacewatch || — || align=right | 1.1 km || 
|-id=553 bgcolor=#E9E9E9
| 229553 ||  || — || December 30, 2005 || Kitt Peak || Spacewatch || — || align=right | 2.5 km || 
|-id=554 bgcolor=#E9E9E9
| 229554 ||  || — || December 31, 2005 || Kitt Peak || Spacewatch || — || align=right | 2.7 km || 
|-id=555 bgcolor=#E9E9E9
| 229555 ||  || — || December 24, 2005 || Kitt Peak || Spacewatch || EUN || align=right | 2.4 km || 
|-id=556 bgcolor=#E9E9E9
| 229556 ||  || — || December 30, 2005 || Mount Lemmon || Mount Lemmon Survey || — || align=right | 3.3 km || 
|-id=557 bgcolor=#E9E9E9
| 229557 ||  || — || December 25, 2005 || Mount Lemmon || Mount Lemmon Survey || — || align=right | 1.9 km || 
|-id=558 bgcolor=#E9E9E9
| 229558 ||  || — || December 26, 2005 || Mount Lemmon || Mount Lemmon Survey || — || align=right | 3.2 km || 
|-id=559 bgcolor=#E9E9E9
| 229559 ||  || — || December 29, 2005 || Kitt Peak || Spacewatch || — || align=right | 2.1 km || 
|-id=560 bgcolor=#E9E9E9
| 229560 ||  || — || December 30, 2005 || Mount Lemmon || Mount Lemmon Survey || WIT || align=right | 1.5 km || 
|-id=561 bgcolor=#E9E9E9
| 229561 ||  || — || December 26, 2005 || Mount Lemmon || Mount Lemmon Survey || — || align=right | 2.3 km || 
|-id=562 bgcolor=#E9E9E9
| 229562 ||  || — || January 2, 2006 || Catalina || CSS || EUN || align=right | 1.8 km || 
|-id=563 bgcolor=#E9E9E9
| 229563 ||  || — || January 2, 2006 || Socorro || LINEAR || HEN || align=right | 1.3 km || 
|-id=564 bgcolor=#fefefe
| 229564 ||  || — || January 6, 2006 || Mount Lemmon || Mount Lemmon Survey || FLO || align=right data-sort-value="0.94" | 940 m || 
|-id=565 bgcolor=#fefefe
| 229565 ||  || — || January 2, 2006 || Mount Lemmon || Mount Lemmon Survey || — || align=right | 1.4 km || 
|-id=566 bgcolor=#E9E9E9
| 229566 ||  || — || January 5, 2006 || Kitt Peak || Spacewatch || MRX || align=right | 1.6 km || 
|-id=567 bgcolor=#E9E9E9
| 229567 ||  || — || January 6, 2006 || Socorro || LINEAR || ADEslow || align=right | 4.7 km || 
|-id=568 bgcolor=#E9E9E9
| 229568 ||  || — || January 7, 2006 || Kitt Peak || Spacewatch || — || align=right | 2.8 km || 
|-id=569 bgcolor=#E9E9E9
| 229569 ||  || — || January 6, 2006 || Kitt Peak || Spacewatch || — || align=right | 1.3 km || 
|-id=570 bgcolor=#E9E9E9
| 229570 ||  || — || January 2, 2006 || Catalina || CSS || — || align=right | 3.9 km || 
|-id=571 bgcolor=#E9E9E9
| 229571 ||  || — || January 5, 2006 || Kitt Peak || Spacewatch || HEN || align=right | 1.0 km || 
|-id=572 bgcolor=#E9E9E9
| 229572 ||  || — || January 8, 2006 || Mount Lemmon || Mount Lemmon Survey || WIT || align=right | 1.5 km || 
|-id=573 bgcolor=#E9E9E9
| 229573 ||  || — || January 7, 2006 || Mount Lemmon || Mount Lemmon Survey || GEF || align=right | 1.8 km || 
|-id=574 bgcolor=#E9E9E9
| 229574 ||  || — || January 10, 2006 || Kitt Peak || Spacewatch || — || align=right | 1.1 km || 
|-id=575 bgcolor=#E9E9E9
| 229575 ||  || — || January 18, 2006 || Catalina || CSS || — || align=right | 2.0 km || 
|-id=576 bgcolor=#E9E9E9
| 229576 ||  || — || January 22, 2006 || Mount Lemmon || Mount Lemmon Survey || — || align=right | 3.1 km || 
|-id=577 bgcolor=#E9E9E9
| 229577 ||  || — || January 22, 2006 || Anderson Mesa || LONEOS || GEF || align=right | 1.9 km || 
|-id=578 bgcolor=#E9E9E9
| 229578 ||  || — || January 23, 2006 || Kitt Peak || Spacewatch || — || align=right | 2.2 km || 
|-id=579 bgcolor=#d6d6d6
| 229579 ||  || — || January 23, 2006 || Kitt Peak || Spacewatch || NAE || align=right | 4.9 km || 
|-id=580 bgcolor=#E9E9E9
| 229580 ||  || — || January 23, 2006 || Kitt Peak || Spacewatch || — || align=right | 2.7 km || 
|-id=581 bgcolor=#E9E9E9
| 229581 ||  || — || January 25, 2006 || Kitt Peak || Spacewatch || AGN || align=right | 2.1 km || 
|-id=582 bgcolor=#E9E9E9
| 229582 ||  || — || January 26, 2006 || Catalina || CSS || — || align=right | 1.8 km || 
|-id=583 bgcolor=#d6d6d6
| 229583 ||  || — || January 26, 2006 || Kitt Peak || Spacewatch || — || align=right | 2.7 km || 
|-id=584 bgcolor=#d6d6d6
| 229584 ||  || — || January 26, 2006 || Kitt Peak || Spacewatch || — || align=right | 3.3 km || 
|-id=585 bgcolor=#E9E9E9
| 229585 ||  || — || January 26, 2006 || Kitt Peak || Spacewatch || MIS || align=right | 2.8 km || 
|-id=586 bgcolor=#E9E9E9
| 229586 ||  || — || January 23, 2006 || Socorro || LINEAR || MRX || align=right | 1.4 km || 
|-id=587 bgcolor=#E9E9E9
| 229587 ||  || — || January 31, 2006 || 7300 Observatory || W. K. Y. Yeung || — || align=right | 1.9 km || 
|-id=588 bgcolor=#E9E9E9
| 229588 ||  || — || January 21, 2006 || Palomar || NEAT || — || align=right | 2.8 km || 
|-id=589 bgcolor=#E9E9E9
| 229589 ||  || — || January 23, 2006 || Kitt Peak || Spacewatch || HEN || align=right | 1.6 km || 
|-id=590 bgcolor=#E9E9E9
| 229590 ||  || — || January 26, 2006 || Mount Lemmon || Mount Lemmon Survey || — || align=right | 3.2 km || 
|-id=591 bgcolor=#E9E9E9
| 229591 ||  || — || January 27, 2006 || Kitt Peak || Spacewatch || — || align=right | 3.9 km || 
|-id=592 bgcolor=#d6d6d6
| 229592 ||  || — || January 27, 2006 || Mount Lemmon || Mount Lemmon Survey || — || align=right | 2.9 km || 
|-id=593 bgcolor=#d6d6d6
| 229593 ||  || — || January 28, 2006 || Kitt Peak || Spacewatch || KOR || align=right | 1.8 km || 
|-id=594 bgcolor=#d6d6d6
| 229594 ||  || — || January 31, 2006 || Kitt Peak || Spacewatch || — || align=right | 3.0 km || 
|-id=595 bgcolor=#E9E9E9
| 229595 ||  || — || January 23, 2006 || Socorro || LINEAR || — || align=right | 3.4 km || 
|-id=596 bgcolor=#E9E9E9
| 229596 ||  || — || January 30, 2006 || Kitt Peak || Spacewatch || — || align=right | 1.6 km || 
|-id=597 bgcolor=#E9E9E9
| 229597 ||  || — || January 30, 2006 || Catalina || CSS || WIT || align=right | 1.6 km || 
|-id=598 bgcolor=#d6d6d6
| 229598 ||  || — || January 31, 2006 || Kitt Peak || Spacewatch || KOR || align=right | 1.7 km || 
|-id=599 bgcolor=#E9E9E9
| 229599 ||  || — || January 31, 2006 || Kitt Peak || Spacewatch || — || align=right | 2.1 km || 
|-id=600 bgcolor=#E9E9E9
| 229600 ||  || — || January 31, 2006 || Catalina || CSS || — || align=right | 3.9 km || 
|}

229601–229700 

|-bgcolor=#d6d6d6
| 229601 ||  || — || January 30, 2006 || Kitt Peak || Spacewatch || — || align=right | 2.7 km || 
|-id=602 bgcolor=#E9E9E9
| 229602 || 2006 CO || — || February 1, 2006 || 7300 Observatory || W. K. Y. Yeung || GEF || align=right | 4.1 km || 
|-id=603 bgcolor=#d6d6d6
| 229603 ||  || — || February 6, 2006 || Socorro || LINEAR || PAL || align=right | 3.8 km || 
|-id=604 bgcolor=#E9E9E9
| 229604 ||  || — || February 1, 2006 || Kitt Peak || Spacewatch || — || align=right | 1.3 km || 
|-id=605 bgcolor=#E9E9E9
| 229605 ||  || — || February 2, 2006 || Mount Lemmon || Mount Lemmon Survey || — || align=right | 3.0 km || 
|-id=606 bgcolor=#E9E9E9
| 229606 ||  || — || February 20, 2006 || Kitt Peak || Spacewatch || — || align=right | 1.1 km || 
|-id=607 bgcolor=#d6d6d6
| 229607 ||  || — || February 21, 2006 || Catalina || CSS || CHA || align=right | 3.6 km || 
|-id=608 bgcolor=#d6d6d6
| 229608 ||  || — || February 20, 2006 || Kitt Peak || Spacewatch || — || align=right | 3.3 km || 
|-id=609 bgcolor=#d6d6d6
| 229609 ||  || — || February 20, 2006 || Kitt Peak || Spacewatch || IMH || align=right | 6.1 km || 
|-id=610 bgcolor=#d6d6d6
| 229610 ||  || — || February 20, 2006 || Mount Lemmon || Mount Lemmon Survey || — || align=right | 3.6 km || 
|-id=611 bgcolor=#d6d6d6
| 229611 ||  || — || February 20, 2006 || Kitt Peak || Spacewatch || — || align=right | 3.2 km || 
|-id=612 bgcolor=#d6d6d6
| 229612 ||  || — || February 20, 2006 || Kitt Peak || Spacewatch || KAR || align=right | 1.6 km || 
|-id=613 bgcolor=#d6d6d6
| 229613 ||  || — || February 24, 2006 || Mount Lemmon || Mount Lemmon Survey || KOR || align=right | 1.8 km || 
|-id=614 bgcolor=#d6d6d6
| 229614 Womack ||  ||  || February 24, 2006 || Mount Lemmon || Mount Lemmon Survey || KOR || align=right | 1.8 km || 
|-id=615 bgcolor=#E9E9E9
| 229615 ||  || — || February 22, 2006 || Anderson Mesa || LONEOS || — || align=right | 1.7 km || 
|-id=616 bgcolor=#d6d6d6
| 229616 ||  || — || February 23, 2006 || Wrightwood || J. W. Young || — || align=right | 5.0 km || 
|-id=617 bgcolor=#d6d6d6
| 229617 ||  || — || February 24, 2006 || Kitt Peak || Spacewatch || — || align=right | 2.8 km || 
|-id=618 bgcolor=#d6d6d6
| 229618 ||  || — || February 24, 2006 || Kitt Peak || Spacewatch || — || align=right | 3.2 km || 
|-id=619 bgcolor=#d6d6d6
| 229619 ||  || — || February 24, 2006 || Kitt Peak || Spacewatch || — || align=right | 2.8 km || 
|-id=620 bgcolor=#d6d6d6
| 229620 ||  || — || February 24, 2006 || Kitt Peak || Spacewatch || — || align=right | 4.8 km || 
|-id=621 bgcolor=#d6d6d6
| 229621 ||  || — || February 24, 2006 || Kitt Peak || Spacewatch || KAR || align=right | 1.7 km || 
|-id=622 bgcolor=#d6d6d6
| 229622 ||  || — || February 22, 2006 || Anderson Mesa || LONEOS || — || align=right | 4.1 km || 
|-id=623 bgcolor=#d6d6d6
| 229623 ||  || — || February 25, 2006 || Mount Lemmon || Mount Lemmon Survey || — || align=right | 3.0 km || 
|-id=624 bgcolor=#E9E9E9
| 229624 ||  || — || February 25, 2006 || Kitt Peak || Spacewatch || — || align=right | 2.7 km || 
|-id=625 bgcolor=#d6d6d6
| 229625 ||  || — || February 25, 2006 || Mount Lemmon || Mount Lemmon Survey || — || align=right | 4.0 km || 
|-id=626 bgcolor=#d6d6d6
| 229626 ||  || — || February 25, 2006 || Kitt Peak || Spacewatch || KOR || align=right | 1.9 km || 
|-id=627 bgcolor=#E9E9E9
| 229627 ||  || — || February 27, 2006 || Kitt Peak || Spacewatch || — || align=right | 3.1 km || 
|-id=628 bgcolor=#E9E9E9
| 229628 ||  || — || February 27, 2006 || Mount Lemmon || Mount Lemmon Survey || — || align=right | 3.3 km || 
|-id=629 bgcolor=#d6d6d6
| 229629 ||  || — || February 27, 2006 || Kitt Peak || Spacewatch || KOR || align=right | 2.2 km || 
|-id=630 bgcolor=#E9E9E9
| 229630 ||  || — || February 25, 2006 || Anderson Mesa || LONEOS || GEF || align=right | 2.0 km || 
|-id=631 bgcolor=#E9E9E9
| 229631 Cluny ||  ||  || March 4, 2006 || Nogales || J.-C. Merlin || — || align=right | 2.1 km || 
|-id=632 bgcolor=#E9E9E9
| 229632 ||  || — || March 3, 2006 || Mount Lemmon || Mount Lemmon Survey || — || align=right | 4.0 km || 
|-id=633 bgcolor=#E9E9E9
| 229633 ||  || — || March 4, 2006 || Catalina || CSS || DOR || align=right | 4.0 km || 
|-id=634 bgcolor=#d6d6d6
| 229634 ||  || — || March 4, 2006 || Catalina || CSS || — || align=right | 5.4 km || 
|-id=635 bgcolor=#E9E9E9
| 229635 ||  || — || March 5, 2006 || Kitt Peak || Spacewatch || NEM || align=right | 2.7 km || 
|-id=636 bgcolor=#d6d6d6
| 229636 ||  || — || March 23, 2006 || Kitt Peak || Spacewatch || KOR || align=right | 1.9 km || 
|-id=637 bgcolor=#E9E9E9
| 229637 ||  || — || March 23, 2006 || Socorro || LINEAR || DOR || align=right | 4.1 km || 
|-id=638 bgcolor=#d6d6d6
| 229638 ||  || — || March 23, 2006 || Mount Lemmon || Mount Lemmon Survey || EOS || align=right | 2.4 km || 
|-id=639 bgcolor=#d6d6d6
| 229639 ||  || — || March 23, 2006 || Kitt Peak || Spacewatch || — || align=right | 3.6 km || 
|-id=640 bgcolor=#d6d6d6
| 229640 ||  || — || March 23, 2006 || Kitt Peak || Spacewatch || — || align=right | 4.3 km || 
|-id=641 bgcolor=#d6d6d6
| 229641 ||  || — || March 23, 2006 || Mount Lemmon || Mount Lemmon Survey || — || align=right | 3.3 km || 
|-id=642 bgcolor=#d6d6d6
| 229642 ||  || — || March 24, 2006 || Bergisch Gladbach || W. Bickel || — || align=right | 4.7 km || 
|-id=643 bgcolor=#d6d6d6
| 229643 ||  || — || March 23, 2006 || Kitt Peak || Spacewatch || KOR || align=right | 2.0 km || 
|-id=644 bgcolor=#d6d6d6
| 229644 ||  || — || March 26, 2006 || Mount Lemmon || Mount Lemmon Survey || — || align=right | 3.3 km || 
|-id=645 bgcolor=#E9E9E9
| 229645 ||  || — || March 25, 2006 || Catalina || CSS || — || align=right | 4.0 km || 
|-id=646 bgcolor=#E9E9E9
| 229646 ||  || — || March 18, 2006 || Siding Spring || SSS || — || align=right | 5.9 km || 
|-id=647 bgcolor=#d6d6d6
| 229647 ||  || — || March 25, 2006 || Kitt Peak || Spacewatch || — || align=right | 3.4 km || 
|-id=648 bgcolor=#d6d6d6
| 229648 ||  || — || April 4, 2006 || Great Shefford || P. Birtwhistle || — || align=right | 5.1 km || 
|-id=649 bgcolor=#E9E9E9
| 229649 ||  || — || April 2, 2006 || Kitt Peak || Spacewatch || AGN || align=right | 2.0 km || 
|-id=650 bgcolor=#d6d6d6
| 229650 ||  || — || April 2, 2006 || Kitt Peak || Spacewatch || — || align=right | 3.6 km || 
|-id=651 bgcolor=#d6d6d6
| 229651 ||  || — || April 8, 2006 || Kitt Peak || Spacewatch || — || align=right | 3.7 km || 
|-id=652 bgcolor=#E9E9E9
| 229652 ||  || — || April 18, 2006 || Palomar || NEAT || — || align=right | 2.8 km || 
|-id=653 bgcolor=#d6d6d6
| 229653 ||  || — || April 18, 2006 || Anderson Mesa || LONEOS || — || align=right | 4.5 km || 
|-id=654 bgcolor=#d6d6d6
| 229654 ||  || — || April 19, 2006 || Mount Lemmon || Mount Lemmon Survey || — || align=right | 4.2 km || 
|-id=655 bgcolor=#d6d6d6
| 229655 ||  || — || April 19, 2006 || Mount Lemmon || Mount Lemmon Survey || K-2 || align=right | 2.0 km || 
|-id=656 bgcolor=#d6d6d6
| 229656 ||  || — || April 19, 2006 || Mount Lemmon || Mount Lemmon Survey || — || align=right | 3.3 km || 
|-id=657 bgcolor=#d6d6d6
| 229657 ||  || — || April 21, 2006 || Catalina || CSS || — || align=right | 7.8 km || 
|-id=658 bgcolor=#d6d6d6
| 229658 ||  || — || April 21, 2006 || Kitt Peak || Spacewatch || — || align=right | 5.0 km || 
|-id=659 bgcolor=#d6d6d6
| 229659 ||  || — || April 25, 2006 || Kitt Peak || Spacewatch || — || align=right | 3.6 km || 
|-id=660 bgcolor=#E9E9E9
| 229660 ||  || — || April 21, 2006 || Catalina || CSS || — || align=right | 1.9 km || 
|-id=661 bgcolor=#d6d6d6
| 229661 ||  || — || May 1, 2006 || Socorro || LINEAR || EUP || align=right | 6.9 km || 
|-id=662 bgcolor=#d6d6d6
| 229662 ||  || — || May 20, 2006 || Palomar || NEAT || — || align=right | 5.2 km || 
|-id=663 bgcolor=#d6d6d6
| 229663 ||  || — || May 20, 2006 || Catalina || CSS || — || align=right | 5.4 km || 
|-id=664 bgcolor=#d6d6d6
| 229664 ||  || — || May 19, 2006 || Mount Lemmon || Mount Lemmon Survey || — || align=right | 3.1 km || 
|-id=665 bgcolor=#d6d6d6
| 229665 ||  || — || June 16, 2006 || Kitt Peak || Spacewatch || — || align=right | 4.2 km || 
|-id=666 bgcolor=#fefefe
| 229666 ||  || — || August 23, 2006 || Socorro || LINEAR || H || align=right | 1.0 km || 
|-id=667 bgcolor=#d6d6d6
| 229667 ||  || — || September 25, 2006 || Mount Lemmon || Mount Lemmon Survey || — || align=right | 2.6 km || 
|-id=668 bgcolor=#fefefe
| 229668 ||  || — || September 30, 2006 || Mount Lemmon || Mount Lemmon Survey || — || align=right data-sort-value="0.74" | 740 m || 
|-id=669 bgcolor=#fefefe
| 229669 ||  || — || October 12, 2006 || Kitt Peak || Spacewatch || — || align=right data-sort-value="0.75" | 750 m || 
|-id=670 bgcolor=#fefefe
| 229670 ||  || — || October 12, 2006 || Palomar || NEAT || H || align=right data-sort-value="0.62" | 620 m || 
|-id=671 bgcolor=#fefefe
| 229671 ||  || — || November 14, 2006 || Catalina || CSS || FLO || align=right data-sort-value="0.79" | 790 m || 
|-id=672 bgcolor=#FFC2E0
| 229672 ||  || — || November 18, 2006 || Kitt Peak || Spacewatch || APO +1km || align=right data-sort-value="0.94" | 940 m || 
|-id=673 bgcolor=#fefefe
| 229673 ||  || — || November 21, 2006 || Mount Lemmon || Mount Lemmon Survey || — || align=right data-sort-value="0.98" | 980 m || 
|-id=674 bgcolor=#fefefe
| 229674 ||  || — || December 21, 2006 || Kitt Peak || Spacewatch || — || align=right data-sort-value="0.89" | 890 m || 
|-id=675 bgcolor=#fefefe
| 229675 ||  || — || January 16, 2007 || Catalina || CSS || FLO || align=right | 1.0 km || 
|-id=676 bgcolor=#fefefe
| 229676 ||  || — || January 16, 2007 || Catalina || CSS || — || align=right | 1.1 km || 
|-id=677 bgcolor=#fefefe
| 229677 ||  || — || January 23, 2007 || Socorro || LINEAR || FLO || align=right data-sort-value="0.90" | 900 m || 
|-id=678 bgcolor=#fefefe
| 229678 ||  || — || January 24, 2007 || Socorro || LINEAR || — || align=right data-sort-value="0.89" | 890 m || 
|-id=679 bgcolor=#fefefe
| 229679 ||  || — || January 27, 2007 || Mount Lemmon || Mount Lemmon Survey || FLO || align=right data-sort-value="0.83" | 830 m || 
|-id=680 bgcolor=#fefefe
| 229680 ||  || — || February 6, 2007 || Palomar || NEAT || — || align=right | 1.1 km || 
|-id=681 bgcolor=#fefefe
| 229681 ||  || — || February 10, 2007 || Catalina || CSS || FLO || align=right data-sort-value="0.90" | 900 m || 
|-id=682 bgcolor=#fefefe
| 229682 ||  || — || February 10, 2007 || Catalina || CSS || — || align=right | 1.4 km || 
|-id=683 bgcolor=#fefefe
| 229683 ||  || — || February 15, 2007 || Palomar || NEAT || — || align=right | 1.1 km || 
|-id=684 bgcolor=#fefefe
| 229684 ||  || — || February 20, 2007 || Vicques || M. Ory || — || align=right | 1.3 km || 
|-id=685 bgcolor=#fefefe
| 229685 ||  || — || February 17, 2007 || Kitt Peak || Spacewatch || NYS || align=right data-sort-value="0.89" | 890 m || 
|-id=686 bgcolor=#E9E9E9
| 229686 ||  || — || February 17, 2007 || Kitt Peak || Spacewatch || MIS || align=right | 3.2 km || 
|-id=687 bgcolor=#fefefe
| 229687 ||  || — || February 21, 2007 || Mount Lemmon || Mount Lemmon Survey || NYS || align=right data-sort-value="0.78" | 780 m || 
|-id=688 bgcolor=#fefefe
| 229688 ||  || — || February 17, 2007 || Kitt Peak || Spacewatch || NYS || align=right data-sort-value="0.86" | 860 m || 
|-id=689 bgcolor=#fefefe
| 229689 ||  || — || February 21, 2007 || Socorro || LINEAR || NYS || align=right data-sort-value="0.93" | 930 m || 
|-id=690 bgcolor=#fefefe
| 229690 ||  || — || February 21, 2007 || Kitt Peak || Spacewatch || ERI || align=right | 2.4 km || 
|-id=691 bgcolor=#fefefe
| 229691 ||  || — || February 23, 2007 || Kitt Peak || Spacewatch || FLO || align=right data-sort-value="0.77" | 770 m || 
|-id=692 bgcolor=#fefefe
| 229692 ||  || — || February 23, 2007 || Mount Lemmon || Mount Lemmon Survey || MAS || align=right data-sort-value="0.78" | 780 m || 
|-id=693 bgcolor=#fefefe
| 229693 ||  || — || February 23, 2007 || Kitt Peak || Spacewatch || — || align=right data-sort-value="0.93" | 930 m || 
|-id=694 bgcolor=#E9E9E9
| 229694 ||  || — || February 23, 2007 || Kitt Peak || Spacewatch || — || align=right | 2.8 km || 
|-id=695 bgcolor=#E9E9E9
| 229695 ||  || — || February 26, 2007 || Mount Lemmon || Mount Lemmon Survey || NEM || align=right | 3.5 km || 
|-id=696 bgcolor=#fefefe
| 229696 ||  || — || February 22, 2007 || Catalina || CSS || — || align=right | 1.2 km || 
|-id=697 bgcolor=#fefefe
| 229697 ||  || — || March 9, 2007 || Palomar || NEAT || — || align=right | 1.1 km || 
|-id=698 bgcolor=#fefefe
| 229698 ||  || — || March 9, 2007 || Catalina || CSS || FLO || align=right | 1.1 km || 
|-id=699 bgcolor=#E9E9E9
| 229699 ||  || — || March 10, 2007 || Palomar || NEAT || — || align=right | 2.6 km || 
|-id=700 bgcolor=#fefefe
| 229700 ||  || — || March 9, 2007 || Palomar || NEAT || — || align=right | 1.1 km || 
|}

229701–229800 

|-bgcolor=#fefefe
| 229701 ||  || — || March 9, 2007 || Mount Lemmon || Mount Lemmon Survey || — || align=right | 1.2 km || 
|-id=702 bgcolor=#d6d6d6
| 229702 ||  || — || March 9, 2007 || Kitt Peak || Spacewatch || KAR || align=right | 1.9 km || 
|-id=703 bgcolor=#fefefe
| 229703 ||  || — || March 10, 2007 || Kitt Peak || Spacewatch || NYS || align=right data-sort-value="0.76" | 760 m || 
|-id=704 bgcolor=#fefefe
| 229704 ||  || — || March 10, 2007 || Kitt Peak || Spacewatch || NYS || align=right data-sort-value="0.74" | 740 m || 
|-id=705 bgcolor=#fefefe
| 229705 ||  || — || March 10, 2007 || Palomar || NEAT || NYS || align=right data-sort-value="0.72" | 720 m || 
|-id=706 bgcolor=#E9E9E9
| 229706 ||  || — || March 12, 2007 || Catalina || CSS || KON || align=right | 3.1 km || 
|-id=707 bgcolor=#E9E9E9
| 229707 ||  || — || March 13, 2007 || Mount Lemmon || Mount Lemmon Survey || — || align=right | 2.7 km || 
|-id=708 bgcolor=#E9E9E9
| 229708 ||  || — || March 13, 2007 || Mount Lemmon || Mount Lemmon Survey || EUN || align=right | 1.8 km || 
|-id=709 bgcolor=#E9E9E9
| 229709 ||  || — || March 13, 2007 || Mount Lemmon || Mount Lemmon Survey || — || align=right | 1.6 km || 
|-id=710 bgcolor=#fefefe
| 229710 ||  || — || March 14, 2007 || Anderson Mesa || LONEOS || — || align=right | 1.3 km || 
|-id=711 bgcolor=#fefefe
| 229711 ||  || — || March 9, 2007 || Mount Lemmon || Mount Lemmon Survey || NYS || align=right | 1.9 km || 
|-id=712 bgcolor=#fefefe
| 229712 ||  || — || March 9, 2007 || Mount Lemmon || Mount Lemmon Survey || NYS || align=right data-sort-value="0.62" | 620 m || 
|-id=713 bgcolor=#fefefe
| 229713 ||  || — || March 12, 2007 || Kitt Peak || Spacewatch || — || align=right | 2.0 km || 
|-id=714 bgcolor=#E9E9E9
| 229714 ||  || — || March 12, 2007 || Mount Lemmon || Mount Lemmon Survey || — || align=right | 1.4 km || 
|-id=715 bgcolor=#fefefe
| 229715 ||  || — || March 13, 2007 || Kitt Peak || Spacewatch || NYS || align=right data-sort-value="0.74" | 740 m || 
|-id=716 bgcolor=#fefefe
| 229716 ||  || — || March 13, 2007 || Mount Lemmon || Mount Lemmon Survey || MAS || align=right data-sort-value="0.71" | 710 m || 
|-id=717 bgcolor=#d6d6d6
| 229717 ||  || — || March 14, 2007 || Kitt Peak || Spacewatch || TRP || align=right | 5.8 km || 
|-id=718 bgcolor=#fefefe
| 229718 ||  || — || March 14, 2007 || Kitt Peak || Spacewatch || NYS || align=right data-sort-value="0.84" | 840 m || 
|-id=719 bgcolor=#fefefe
| 229719 ||  || — || March 8, 2007 || Palomar || NEAT || — || align=right data-sort-value="0.90" | 900 m || 
|-id=720 bgcolor=#d6d6d6
| 229720 ||  || — || March 15, 2007 || Kitt Peak || Spacewatch || — || align=right | 2.9 km || 
|-id=721 bgcolor=#fefefe
| 229721 ||  || — || March 26, 2007 || Kitt Peak || Spacewatch || — || align=right | 1.2 km || 
|-id=722 bgcolor=#E9E9E9
| 229722 || 2007 GE || — || April 6, 2007 || Vicques || M. Ory || — || align=right | 2.2 km || 
|-id=723 bgcolor=#E9E9E9
| 229723 Marcoludwig ||  ||  || April 11, 2007 || Altschwendt || W. Ries || — || align=right | 3.0 km || 
|-id=724 bgcolor=#fefefe
| 229724 ||  || — || April 7, 2007 || Mount Lemmon || Mount Lemmon Survey || — || align=right data-sort-value="0.83" | 830 m || 
|-id=725 bgcolor=#E9E9E9
| 229725 ||  || — || April 11, 2007 || Kitt Peak || Spacewatch || MIS || align=right | 2.9 km || 
|-id=726 bgcolor=#E9E9E9
| 229726 ||  || — || April 11, 2007 || Kitt Peak || Spacewatch || — || align=right | 3.4 km || 
|-id=727 bgcolor=#fefefe
| 229727 ||  || — || April 11, 2007 || Kitt Peak || Spacewatch || — || align=right data-sort-value="0.98" | 980 m || 
|-id=728 bgcolor=#E9E9E9
| 229728 ||  || — || April 14, 2007 || Mount Lemmon || Mount Lemmon Survey || — || align=right | 1.6 km || 
|-id=729 bgcolor=#fefefe
| 229729 ||  || — || April 14, 2007 || Kitt Peak || Spacewatch || V || align=right | 1.00 km || 
|-id=730 bgcolor=#fefefe
| 229730 ||  || — || April 14, 2007 || Kitt Peak || Spacewatch || NYS || align=right data-sort-value="0.68" | 680 m || 
|-id=731 bgcolor=#d6d6d6
| 229731 ||  || — || April 14, 2007 || Kitt Peak || Spacewatch || THM || align=right | 2.9 km || 
|-id=732 bgcolor=#d6d6d6
| 229732 ||  || — || April 14, 2007 || Kitt Peak || Spacewatch || EOS || align=right | 2.3 km || 
|-id=733 bgcolor=#E9E9E9
| 229733 ||  || — || April 14, 2007 || Mount Lemmon || Mount Lemmon Survey || HEN || align=right | 1.3 km || 
|-id=734 bgcolor=#d6d6d6
| 229734 ||  || — || April 14, 2007 || Kitt Peak || Spacewatch || — || align=right | 3.0 km || 
|-id=735 bgcolor=#E9E9E9
| 229735 ||  || — || April 16, 2007 || Catalina || CSS || — || align=right | 2.0 km || 
|-id=736 bgcolor=#E9E9E9
| 229736 ||  || — || April 16, 2007 || Catalina || CSS || EUN || align=right | 1.8 km || 
|-id=737 bgcolor=#E9E9E9
| 229737 Porthos ||  ||  || April 19, 2007 || Saint-Sulpice || B. Christophe || — || align=right | 2.9 km || 
|-id=738 bgcolor=#E9E9E9
| 229738 ||  || — || April 18, 2007 || Kitt Peak || Spacewatch || — || align=right | 1.3 km || 
|-id=739 bgcolor=#E9E9E9
| 229739 ||  || — || April 18, 2007 || Kitt Peak || Spacewatch || — || align=right | 2.8 km || 
|-id=740 bgcolor=#E9E9E9
| 229740 ||  || — || April 20, 2007 || Kitt Peak || Spacewatch || — || align=right | 4.0 km || 
|-id=741 bgcolor=#d6d6d6
| 229741 ||  || — || April 23, 2007 || Catalina || CSS || — || align=right | 4.5 km || 
|-id=742 bgcolor=#fefefe
| 229742 ||  || — || April 22, 2007 || Catalina || CSS || V || align=right data-sort-value="0.98" | 980 m || 
|-id=743 bgcolor=#d6d6d6
| 229743 ||  || — || May 7, 2007 || XuYi || PMO NEO || URS || align=right | 7.0 km || 
|-id=744 bgcolor=#d6d6d6
| 229744 ||  || — || May 9, 2007 || Mount Lemmon || Mount Lemmon Survey || — || align=right | 3.2 km || 
|-id=745 bgcolor=#d6d6d6
| 229745 ||  || — || May 10, 2007 || Mount Lemmon || Mount Lemmon Survey || KOR || align=right | 1.8 km || 
|-id=746 bgcolor=#d6d6d6
| 229746 ||  || — || May 7, 2007 || Kitt Peak || Spacewatch || KOR || align=right | 2.7 km || 
|-id=747 bgcolor=#E9E9E9
| 229747 ||  || — || May 9, 2007 || Kitt Peak || Spacewatch || — || align=right | 3.5 km || 
|-id=748 bgcolor=#d6d6d6
| 229748 ||  || — || May 10, 2007 || Mount Lemmon || Mount Lemmon Survey || — || align=right | 2.8 km || 
|-id=749 bgcolor=#E9E9E9
| 229749 ||  || — || May 11, 2007 || Siding Spring || SSS || MIT || align=right | 4.0 km || 
|-id=750 bgcolor=#E9E9E9
| 229750 ||  || — || May 13, 2007 || Tiki || S. F. Hönig, N. Teamo || — || align=right | 3.4 km || 
|-id=751 bgcolor=#d6d6d6
| 229751 ||  || — || May 9, 2007 || Kitt Peak || Spacewatch || — || align=right | 5.8 km || 
|-id=752 bgcolor=#E9E9E9
| 229752 ||  || — || May 14, 2007 || Tiki || S. F. Hönig, N. Teamo || NEM || align=right | 3.2 km || 
|-id=753 bgcolor=#d6d6d6
| 229753 ||  || — || May 23, 2007 || 7300 Observatory || W. K. Y. Yeung || — || align=right | 4.1 km || 
|-id=754 bgcolor=#E9E9E9
| 229754 ||  || — || May 25, 2007 || Mount Lemmon || Mount Lemmon Survey || — || align=right | 1.5 km || 
|-id=755 bgcolor=#d6d6d6
| 229755 ||  || — || June 8, 2007 || Kitt Peak || Spacewatch || — || align=right | 3.7 km || 
|-id=756 bgcolor=#d6d6d6
| 229756 ||  || — || June 9, 2007 || Kitt Peak || Spacewatch || — || align=right | 5.4 km || 
|-id=757 bgcolor=#E9E9E9
| 229757 ||  || — || June 19, 2007 || Kitt Peak || Spacewatch || — || align=right | 1.3 km || 
|-id=758 bgcolor=#E9E9E9
| 229758 || 2007 NG || — || July 7, 2007 || Sandlot || G. Hug || — || align=right | 3.6 km || 
|-id=759 bgcolor=#d6d6d6
| 229759 ||  || — || July 14, 2007 || Tiki || S. F. Hönig, N. Teamo || HYG || align=right | 3.4 km || 
|-id=760 bgcolor=#C2FFFF
| 229760 ||  || — || September 10, 2007 || Kitt Peak || Spacewatch || L4 || align=right | 11 km || 
|-id=761 bgcolor=#C2FFFF
| 229761 ||  || — || September 11, 2007 || Mount Lemmon || Mount Lemmon Survey || L4 || align=right | 9.6 km || 
|-id=762 bgcolor=#C2E0FF
| 229762 Gǃkúnǁʼhòmdímà ||  ||  || October 19, 2007 || Palomar || M. E. Schwamb, M. E. Brown, D. L. Rabinowitz || SDOmoon || align=right | 864 km || 
|-id=763 bgcolor=#fefefe
| 229763 ||  || — || March 28, 2008 || Kitt Peak || Spacewatch || FLO || align=right data-sort-value="0.76" | 760 m || 
|-id=764 bgcolor=#fefefe
| 229764 ||  || — || March 28, 2008 || Mount Lemmon || Mount Lemmon Survey || V || align=right data-sort-value="0.86" | 860 m || 
|-id=765 bgcolor=#fefefe
| 229765 ||  || — || March 29, 2008 || Mount Lemmon || Mount Lemmon Survey || MAS || align=right | 1.0 km || 
|-id=766 bgcolor=#fefefe
| 229766 ||  || — || April 7, 2008 || Kitt Peak || Spacewatch || FLO || align=right data-sort-value="0.88" | 880 m || 
|-id=767 bgcolor=#fefefe
| 229767 ||  || — || April 29, 2008 || Mount Lemmon || Mount Lemmon Survey || — || align=right data-sort-value="0.87" | 870 m || 
|-id=768 bgcolor=#fefefe
| 229768 ||  || — || April 26, 2008 || Kitt Peak || Spacewatch || — || align=right data-sort-value="0.96" | 960 m || 
|-id=769 bgcolor=#E9E9E9
| 229769 ||  || — || May 6, 2008 || Reedy Creek || J. Broughton || — || align=right | 2.3 km || 
|-id=770 bgcolor=#E9E9E9
| 229770 ||  || — || May 3, 2008 || Mount Lemmon || Mount Lemmon Survey || — || align=right | 1.2 km || 
|-id=771 bgcolor=#fefefe
| 229771 ||  || — || May 7, 2008 || Kitt Peak || Spacewatch || — || align=right data-sort-value="0.86" | 860 m || 
|-id=772 bgcolor=#E9E9E9
| 229772 ||  || — || May 29, 2008 || Mount Lemmon || Mount Lemmon Survey || — || align=right | 1.5 km || 
|-id=773 bgcolor=#E9E9E9
| 229773 ||  || — || June 6, 2008 || Kitt Peak || Spacewatch || — || align=right | 1.7 km || 
|-id=774 bgcolor=#d6d6d6
| 229774 ||  || — || June 8, 2008 || Kitt Peak || Spacewatch || — || align=right | 4.9 km || 
|-id=775 bgcolor=#E9E9E9
| 229775 ||  || — || June 9, 2008 || Kitt Peak || Spacewatch || — || align=right | 1.6 km || 
|-id=776 bgcolor=#fefefe
| 229776 ||  || — || June 24, 2008 || Kitt Peak || Spacewatch || V || align=right data-sort-value="0.77" | 770 m || 
|-id=777 bgcolor=#d6d6d6
| 229777 ENIAC ||  ||  || June 28, 2008 || La Cañada || J. Lacruz || — || align=right | 3.6 km || 
|-id=778 bgcolor=#E9E9E9
| 229778 ||  || — || July 10, 2008 || Siding Spring || SSS || — || align=right | 3.4 km || 
|-id=779 bgcolor=#E9E9E9
| 229779 ||  || — || July 29, 2008 || Kitt Peak || Spacewatch || HOF || align=right | 3.0 km || 
|-id=780 bgcolor=#d6d6d6
| 229780 ||  || — || July 30, 2008 || Mount Lemmon || Mount Lemmon Survey || KOR || align=right | 2.2 km || 
|-id=781 bgcolor=#d6d6d6
| 229781 Arthurmcdonald ||  ||  || August 3, 2008 || Vallemare di Borbona || V. S. Casulli || — || align=right | 5.5 km || 
|-id=782 bgcolor=#E9E9E9
| 229782 ||  || — || August 4, 2008 || Dauban || F. Kugel || — || align=right | 2.0 km || 
|-id=783 bgcolor=#d6d6d6
| 229783 ||  || — || August 11, 2008 || La Sagra || OAM Obs. || VER || align=right | 3.9 km || 
|-id=784 bgcolor=#E9E9E9
| 229784 ||  || — || August 13, 2008 || Siding Spring || SSS || — || align=right | 2.9 km || 
|-id=785 bgcolor=#d6d6d6
| 229785 ||  || — || August 23, 2008 || Marly || P. Kocher || — || align=right | 3.4 km || 
|-id=786 bgcolor=#d6d6d6
| 229786 ||  || — || August 25, 2008 || La Sagra || OAM Obs. || THM || align=right | 3.1 km || 
|-id=787 bgcolor=#d6d6d6
| 229787 ||  || — || August 26, 2008 || Socorro || LINEAR || EOS || align=right | 2.9 km || 
|-id=788 bgcolor=#fefefe
| 229788 ||  || — || August 24, 2008 || Kitt Peak || Spacewatch || — || align=right | 1.4 km || 
|-id=789 bgcolor=#d6d6d6
| 229789 ||  || — || September 3, 2008 || Kitt Peak || Spacewatch || — || align=right | 7.0 km || 
|-id=790 bgcolor=#fefefe
| 229790 ||  || — || September 2, 2008 || Kitt Peak || Spacewatch || MAS || align=right | 1.1 km || 
|-id=791 bgcolor=#d6d6d6
| 229791 ||  || — || September 2, 2008 || Kitt Peak || Spacewatch || THM || align=right | 3.6 km || 
|-id=792 bgcolor=#d6d6d6
| 229792 ||  || — || September 9, 2008 || Bergisch Gladbach || W. Bickel || — || align=right | 3.2 km || 
|-id=793 bgcolor=#E9E9E9
| 229793 ||  || — || September 5, 2008 || Kitt Peak || Spacewatch || WIT || align=right | 1.4 km || 
|-id=794 bgcolor=#d6d6d6
| 229794 ||  || — || September 2, 2008 || Kitt Peak || Spacewatch || KOR || align=right | 1.6 km || 
|-id=795 bgcolor=#d6d6d6
| 229795 ||  || — || September 3, 2008 || Kitt Peak || Spacewatch || HIL3:2 || align=right | 5.9 km || 
|-id=796 bgcolor=#d6d6d6
| 229796 ||  || — || September 3, 2008 || Kitt Peak || Spacewatch || — || align=right | 3.2 km || 
|-id=797 bgcolor=#d6d6d6
| 229797 ||  || — || September 8, 2008 || Catalina || CSS || — || align=right | 5.4 km || 
|-id=798 bgcolor=#d6d6d6
| 229798 ||  || — || September 19, 2008 || Kitt Peak || Spacewatch || — || align=right | 2.8 km || 
|-id=799 bgcolor=#d6d6d6
| 229799 ||  || — || September 19, 2008 || Kitt Peak || Spacewatch || — || align=right | 3.0 km || 
|-id=800 bgcolor=#d6d6d6
| 229800 ||  || — || September 20, 2008 || Kitt Peak || Spacewatch || — || align=right | 3.0 km || 
|}

229801–229900 

|-bgcolor=#E9E9E9
| 229801 ||  || — || September 20, 2008 || Kitt Peak || Spacewatch || — || align=right | 2.8 km || 
|-id=802 bgcolor=#d6d6d6
| 229802 ||  || — || September 20, 2008 || Kitt Peak || Spacewatch || HYG || align=right | 3.6 km || 
|-id=803 bgcolor=#E9E9E9
| 229803 ||  || — || September 20, 2008 || Mount Lemmon || Mount Lemmon Survey || — || align=right | 3.0 km || 
|-id=804 bgcolor=#d6d6d6
| 229804 ||  || — || September 20, 2008 || Catalina || CSS || HYG || align=right | 5.5 km || 
|-id=805 bgcolor=#E9E9E9
| 229805 ||  || — || September 22, 2008 || Kitt Peak || Spacewatch || — || align=right | 2.6 km || 
|-id=806 bgcolor=#E9E9E9
| 229806 ||  || — || September 22, 2008 || Kitt Peak || Spacewatch || — || align=right | 3.3 km || 
|-id=807 bgcolor=#E9E9E9
| 229807 ||  || — || September 21, 2008 || Catalina || CSS || — || align=right | 2.1 km || 
|-id=808 bgcolor=#C2FFFF
| 229808 ||  || — || September 26, 2008 || Kitt Peak || Spacewatch || L4 || align=right | 14 km || 
|-id=809 bgcolor=#C2FFFF
| 229809 ||  || — || September 28, 2008 || Socorro || LINEAR || L4 || align=right | 13 km || 
|-id=810 bgcolor=#d6d6d6
| 229810 ||  || — || September 28, 2008 || Socorro || LINEAR || THM || align=right | 3.2 km || 
|-id=811 bgcolor=#C2FFFF
| 229811 ||  || — || September 25, 2008 || Kitt Peak || Spacewatch || L4 || align=right | 11 km || 
|-id=812 bgcolor=#d6d6d6
| 229812 ||  || — || September 26, 2008 || Kitt Peak || Spacewatch || — || align=right | 2.7 km || 
|-id=813 bgcolor=#C2FFFF
| 229813 ||  || — || September 25, 2008 || Mount Lemmon || Mount Lemmon Survey || L4 || align=right | 10 km || 
|-id=814 bgcolor=#d6d6d6
| 229814 ||  || — || September 30, 2008 || La Sagra || OAM Obs. || KOR || align=right | 1.8 km || 
|-id=815 bgcolor=#d6d6d6
| 229815 ||  || — || September 21, 2008 || Catalina || CSS || — || align=right | 6.3 km || 
|-id=816 bgcolor=#C2FFFF
| 229816 ||  || — || September 24, 2008 || Kitt Peak || Spacewatch || L4 || align=right | 8.9 km || 
|-id=817 bgcolor=#E9E9E9
| 229817 ||  || — || September 20, 2008 || Kitt Peak || Spacewatch || AST || align=right | 3.6 km || 
|-id=818 bgcolor=#E9E9E9
| 229818 ||  || — || October 1, 2008 || La Sagra || OAM Obs. || HEN || align=right | 1.5 km || 
|-id=819 bgcolor=#d6d6d6
| 229819 ||  || — || October 1, 2008 || Mount Lemmon || Mount Lemmon Survey || — || align=right | 2.7 km || 
|-id=820 bgcolor=#E9E9E9
| 229820 ||  || — || October 3, 2008 || Kitt Peak || Spacewatch || — || align=right | 3.3 km || 
|-id=821 bgcolor=#d6d6d6
| 229821 ||  || — || October 6, 2008 || Kitt Peak || Spacewatch || — || align=right | 3.4 km || 
|-id=822 bgcolor=#C2FFFF
| 229822 ||  || — || October 6, 2008 || Catalina || CSS || L4ERY || align=right | 14 km || 
|-id=823 bgcolor=#d6d6d6
| 229823 ||  || — || October 9, 2008 || Mount Lemmon || Mount Lemmon Survey || — || align=right | 2.9 km || 
|-id=824 bgcolor=#d6d6d6
| 229824 ||  || — || October 21, 2008 || Goodricke-Pigott || R. A. Tucker || — || align=right | 5.6 km || 
|-id=825 bgcolor=#E9E9E9
| 229825 ||  || — || October 25, 2008 || Wildberg || R. Apitzsch || — || align=right | 5.3 km || 
|-id=826 bgcolor=#C2FFFF
| 229826 ||  || — || October 17, 2008 || Kitt Peak || Spacewatch || L4 || align=right | 12 km || 
|-id=827 bgcolor=#d6d6d6
| 229827 ||  || — || October 21, 2008 || Kitt Peak || Spacewatch || KOR || align=right | 1.7 km || 
|-id=828 bgcolor=#d6d6d6
| 229828 ||  || — || October 22, 2008 || Kitt Peak || Spacewatch || — || align=right | 5.7 km || 
|-id=829 bgcolor=#d6d6d6
| 229829 ||  || — || October 23, 2008 || Kitt Peak || Spacewatch || — || align=right | 5.1 km || 
|-id=830 bgcolor=#d6d6d6
| 229830 ||  || — || October 24, 2008 || Catalina || CSS || EOS || align=right | 3.0 km || 
|-id=831 bgcolor=#E9E9E9
| 229831 ||  || — || November 3, 2008 || Mount Lemmon || Mount Lemmon Survey || MAR || align=right | 1.7 km || 
|-id=832 bgcolor=#C2FFFF
| 229832 ||  || — || November 17, 2008 || Kitt Peak || Spacewatch || L4 || align=right | 8.7 km || 
|-id=833 bgcolor=#fefefe
| 229833 ||  || — || January 16, 2009 || Kitt Peak || Spacewatch || — || align=right data-sort-value="0.78" | 780 m || 
|-id=834 bgcolor=#d6d6d6
| 229834 ||  || — || March 26, 2009 || Kitt Peak || Spacewatch || KOR || align=right | 2.0 km || 
|-id=835 bgcolor=#FA8072
| 229835 ||  || — || August 24, 2009 || La Sagra || OAM Obs. || — || align=right | 1.1 km || 
|-id=836 bgcolor=#d6d6d6
| 229836 Wladimarinello ||  ||  || August 28, 2009 || Lumezzane || M. Micheli, G. P. Pizzetti || — || align=right | 3.1 km || 
|-id=837 bgcolor=#d6d6d6
| 229837 ||  || — || September 12, 2009 || Kitt Peak || Spacewatch || — || align=right | 2.5 km || 
|-id=838 bgcolor=#E9E9E9
| 229838 ||  || — || September 12, 2009 || Kitt Peak || Spacewatch || HEN || align=right | 1.5 km || 
|-id=839 bgcolor=#fefefe
| 229839 ||  || — || September 16, 2009 || Kitt Peak || Spacewatch || — || align=right | 1.1 km || 
|-id=840 bgcolor=#d6d6d6
| 229840 ||  || — || September 22, 2009 || Dauban || F. Kugel || — || align=right | 4.0 km || 
|-id=841 bgcolor=#fefefe
| 229841 ||  || — || September 18, 2009 || Kitt Peak || Spacewatch || — || align=right data-sort-value="0.95" | 950 m || 
|-id=842 bgcolor=#E9E9E9
| 229842 ||  || — || September 19, 2009 || Kitt Peak || Spacewatch || — || align=right | 3.1 km || 
|-id=843 bgcolor=#fefefe
| 229843 ||  || — || September 19, 2009 || Kitt Peak || Spacewatch || — || align=right data-sort-value="0.96" | 960 m || 
|-id=844 bgcolor=#fefefe
| 229844 ||  || — || September 22, 2009 || Kitt Peak || Spacewatch || NYS || align=right data-sort-value="0.64" | 640 m || 
|-id=845 bgcolor=#E9E9E9
| 229845 ||  || — || September 16, 2009 || Kitt Peak || Spacewatch || AGN || align=right | 1.6 km || 
|-id=846 bgcolor=#E9E9E9
| 229846 ||  || — || September 17, 2009 || Mount Lemmon || Mount Lemmon Survey || MRX || align=right | 1.3 km || 
|-id=847 bgcolor=#d6d6d6
| 229847 ||  || — || September 16, 2009 || Mount Lemmon || Mount Lemmon Survey || — || align=right | 2.8 km || 
|-id=848 bgcolor=#fefefe
| 229848 ||  || — || September 20, 2009 || Mount Lemmon || Mount Lemmon Survey || — || align=right | 1.1 km || 
|-id=849 bgcolor=#fefefe
| 229849 ||  || — || September 23, 2009 || Kitt Peak || Spacewatch || MAS || align=right data-sort-value="0.78" | 780 m || 
|-id=850 bgcolor=#fefefe
| 229850 ||  || — || September 20, 2009 || Catalina || CSS || H || align=right data-sort-value="0.84" | 840 m || 
|-id=851 bgcolor=#C2FFFF
| 229851 ||  || — || September 23, 2009 || Mount Lemmon || Mount Lemmon Survey || L4 || align=right | 17 km || 
|-id=852 bgcolor=#fefefe
| 229852 ||  || — || September 25, 2009 || Kitt Peak || Spacewatch || — || align=right data-sort-value="0.91" | 910 m || 
|-id=853 bgcolor=#d6d6d6
| 229853 ||  || — || September 25, 2009 || Kitt Peak || Spacewatch || THM || align=right | 2.9 km || 
|-id=854 bgcolor=#E9E9E9
| 229854 ||  || — || September 25, 2009 || Kitt Peak || Spacewatch || — || align=right | 2.0 km || 
|-id=855 bgcolor=#d6d6d6
| 229855 ||  || — || September 25, 2009 || Catalina || CSS || EOS || align=right | 2.8 km || 
|-id=856 bgcolor=#E9E9E9
| 229856 ||  || — || September 22, 2009 || Mount Lemmon || Mount Lemmon Survey || — || align=right | 3.6 km || 
|-id=857 bgcolor=#E9E9E9
| 229857 ||  || — || September 20, 2009 || Mount Lemmon || Mount Lemmon Survey || — || align=right | 2.0 km || 
|-id=858 bgcolor=#d6d6d6
| 229858 ||  || — || October 11, 2009 || La Sagra || OAM Obs. || — || align=right | 5.5 km || 
|-id=859 bgcolor=#C2FFFF
| 229859 ||  || — || October 12, 2009 || La Sagra || OAM Obs. || L4 || align=right | 14 km || 
|-id=860 bgcolor=#E9E9E9
| 229860 ||  || — || October 14, 2009 || Bergisch Gladbach || W. Bickel || EUN || align=right | 1.5 km || 
|-id=861 bgcolor=#d6d6d6
| 229861 ||  || — || October 15, 2009 || La Sagra || OAM Obs. || HYG || align=right | 4.7 km || 
|-id=862 bgcolor=#d6d6d6
| 229862 ||  || — || October 15, 2009 || Catalina || CSS || URS || align=right | 7.2 km || 
|-id=863 bgcolor=#E9E9E9
| 229863 ||  || — || October 11, 2009 || Mount Lemmon || Mount Lemmon Survey || — || align=right | 2.9 km || 
|-id=864 bgcolor=#d6d6d6
| 229864 Sichouzhilu ||  ||  || October 14, 2009 || XuYi || PMO NEO || — || align=right | 5.7 km || 
|-id=865 bgcolor=#fefefe
| 229865 ||  || — || October 14, 2009 || La Sagra || OAM Obs. || FLO || align=right | 1.5 km || 
|-id=866 bgcolor=#d6d6d6
| 229866 ||  || — || October 15, 2009 || La Sagra || OAM Obs. || — || align=right | 5.3 km || 
|-id=867 bgcolor=#E9E9E9
| 229867 ||  || — || October 15, 2009 || Mount Lemmon || Mount Lemmon Survey || — || align=right | 3.2 km || 
|-id=868 bgcolor=#d6d6d6
| 229868 ||  || — || October 14, 2009 || La Sagra || OAM Obs. || — || align=right | 4.0 km || 
|-id=869 bgcolor=#d6d6d6
| 229869 ||  || — || October 20, 2009 || Mayhill || A. Lowe || — || align=right | 3.3 km || 
|-id=870 bgcolor=#d6d6d6
| 229870 ||  || — || October 17, 2009 || La Sagra || OAM Obs. || — || align=right | 3.1 km || 
|-id=871 bgcolor=#fefefe
| 229871 ||  || — || October 21, 2009 || Catalina || CSS || FLO || align=right | 1.9 km || 
|-id=872 bgcolor=#d6d6d6
| 229872 ||  || — || October 18, 2009 || Mount Lemmon || Mount Lemmon Survey || HYG || align=right | 3.2 km || 
|-id=873 bgcolor=#d6d6d6
| 229873 ||  || — || October 18, 2009 || Mount Lemmon || Mount Lemmon Survey || — || align=right | 4.4 km || 
|-id=874 bgcolor=#d6d6d6
| 229874 ||  || — || October 18, 2009 || Mount Lemmon || Mount Lemmon Survey || — || align=right | 4.0 km || 
|-id=875 bgcolor=#d6d6d6
| 229875 ||  || — || October 18, 2009 || Mount Lemmon || Mount Lemmon Survey || — || align=right | 4.3 km || 
|-id=876 bgcolor=#d6d6d6
| 229876 ||  || — || October 21, 2009 || Mount Lemmon || Mount Lemmon Survey || — || align=right | 6.6 km || 
|-id=877 bgcolor=#E9E9E9
| 229877 ||  || — || October 21, 2009 || Mount Lemmon || Mount Lemmon Survey || — || align=right | 1.6 km || 
|-id=878 bgcolor=#C2FFFF
| 229878 ||  || — || October 18, 2009 || La Sagra || OAM Obs. || L4 || align=right | 10 km || 
|-id=879 bgcolor=#E9E9E9
| 229879 ||  || — || October 18, 2009 || Mount Lemmon || Mount Lemmon Survey || — || align=right | 4.6 km || 
|-id=880 bgcolor=#d6d6d6
| 229880 ||  || — || October 22, 2009 || Catalina || CSS || — || align=right | 6.3 km || 
|-id=881 bgcolor=#E9E9E9
| 229881 ||  || — || October 22, 2009 || Mount Lemmon || Mount Lemmon Survey || — || align=right | 2.1 km || 
|-id=882 bgcolor=#d6d6d6
| 229882 ||  || — || October 22, 2009 || Mount Lemmon || Mount Lemmon Survey || — || align=right | 3.5 km || 
|-id=883 bgcolor=#E9E9E9
| 229883 ||  || — || October 23, 2009 || Mount Lemmon || Mount Lemmon Survey || ADE || align=right | 4.1 km || 
|-id=884 bgcolor=#E9E9E9
| 229884 ||  || — || October 23, 2009 || Mount Lemmon || Mount Lemmon Survey || AER || align=right | 1.9 km || 
|-id=885 bgcolor=#E9E9E9
| 229885 ||  || — || October 23, 2009 || Mount Lemmon || Mount Lemmon Survey || — || align=right | 1.3 km || 
|-id=886 bgcolor=#E9E9E9
| 229886 ||  || — || October 23, 2009 || Mount Lemmon || Mount Lemmon Survey || AGN || align=right | 1.7 km || 
|-id=887 bgcolor=#d6d6d6
| 229887 ||  || — || October 23, 2009 || Mount Lemmon || Mount Lemmon Survey || — || align=right | 3.5 km || 
|-id=888 bgcolor=#fefefe
| 229888 ||  || — || October 24, 2009 || Catalina || CSS || — || align=right | 1.1 km || 
|-id=889 bgcolor=#E9E9E9
| 229889 ||  || — || October 24, 2009 || Catalina || CSS || ADE || align=right | 4.9 km || 
|-id=890 bgcolor=#fefefe
| 229890 ||  || — || October 23, 2009 || Kitt Peak || Spacewatch || NYS || align=right data-sort-value="0.71" | 710 m || 
|-id=891 bgcolor=#d6d6d6
| 229891 ||  || — || October 23, 2009 || Kitt Peak || Spacewatch || — || align=right | 3.5 km || 
|-id=892 bgcolor=#d6d6d6
| 229892 ||  || — || October 28, 2009 || Bisei SG Center || BATTeRS || — || align=right | 3.5 km || 
|-id=893 bgcolor=#E9E9E9
| 229893 ||  || — || October 26, 2009 || Kitt Peak || Spacewatch || — || align=right | 2.8 km || 
|-id=894 bgcolor=#E9E9E9
| 229894 ||  || — || October 29, 2009 || La Sagra || OAM Obs. || BRU || align=right | 4.4 km || 
|-id=895 bgcolor=#E9E9E9
| 229895 ||  || — || November 9, 2009 || Mayhill || iTelescope Obs. || — || align=right | 1.5 km || 
|-id=896 bgcolor=#fefefe
| 229896 ||  || — || November 10, 2009 || Mayhill || iTelescope Obs. || — || align=right data-sort-value="0.89" | 890 m || 
|-id=897 bgcolor=#d6d6d6
| 229897 ||  || — || November 9, 2009 || Mount Lemmon || Mount Lemmon Survey || HYG || align=right | 4.2 km || 
|-id=898 bgcolor=#fefefe
| 229898 ||  || — || November 9, 2009 || Mount Lemmon || Mount Lemmon Survey || — || align=right data-sort-value="0.80" | 800 m || 
|-id=899 bgcolor=#d6d6d6
| 229899 ||  || — || November 11, 2009 || Tzec Maun || F. Tozzi || — || align=right | 5.2 km || 
|-id=900 bgcolor=#E9E9E9
| 229900 Emmagreaves ||  ||  || November 14, 2009 || Mayhill || N. Falla || — || align=right | 1.5 km || 
|}

229901–230000 

|-bgcolor=#d6d6d6
| 229901 ||  || — || November 8, 2009 || Kitt Peak || Spacewatch || — || align=right | 3.4 km || 
|-id=902 bgcolor=#C2FFFF
| 229902 ||  || — || November 15, 2009 || Catalina || CSS || L4 || align=right | 12 km || 
|-id=903 bgcolor=#d6d6d6
| 229903 ||  || — || November 16, 2009 || Mount Lemmon || Mount Lemmon Survey || — || align=right | 3.7 km || 
|-id=904 bgcolor=#E9E9E9
| 229904 ||  || — || November 17, 2009 || Mount Lemmon || Mount Lemmon Survey || GEF || align=right | 5.0 km || 
|-id=905 bgcolor=#d6d6d6
| 229905 ||  || — || November 16, 2009 || Kitt Peak || Spacewatch || — || align=right | 3.9 km || 
|-id=906 bgcolor=#d6d6d6
| 229906 ||  || — || November 19, 2009 || Kitt Peak || Spacewatch || — || align=right | 5.0 km || 
|-id=907 bgcolor=#fefefe
| 229907 || 4513 P-L || — || September 24, 1960 || Palomar || PLS || NYS || align=right | 2.0 km || 
|-id=908 bgcolor=#fefefe
| 229908 || 6005 P-L || — || September 24, 1960 || Palomar || PLS || MAS || align=right data-sort-value="0.80" | 800 m || 
|-id=909 bgcolor=#fefefe
| 229909 || 6201 P-L || — || September 24, 1960 || Palomar || PLS || — || align=right data-sort-value="0.72" | 720 m || 
|-id=910 bgcolor=#fefefe
| 229910 || 6798 P-L || — || September 24, 1960 || Palomar || PLS || — || align=right | 1.3 km || 
|-id=911 bgcolor=#E9E9E9
| 229911 || 2107 T-3 || — || October 16, 1977 || Palomar || PLS || — || align=right | 2.5 km || 
|-id=912 bgcolor=#E9E9E9
| 229912 || 4378 T-3 || — || October 16, 1977 || Palomar || PLS || NEM || align=right | 2.7 km || 
|-id=913 bgcolor=#fefefe
| 229913 || 4503 T-3 || — || October 16, 1977 || Palomar || PLS || — || align=right | 1.0 km || 
|-id=914 bgcolor=#d6d6d6
| 229914 || 5104 T-3 || — || October 16, 1977 || Palomar || PLS || EOS || align=right | 3.5 km || 
|-id=915 bgcolor=#E9E9E9
| 229915 || 1990 SH || — || September 17, 1990 || Siding Spring || R. H. McNaught || — || align=right | 4.4 km || 
|-id=916 bgcolor=#fefefe
| 229916 ||  || — || February 1, 1995 || Kitt Peak || Spacewatch || NYS || align=right data-sort-value="0.86" | 860 m || 
|-id=917 bgcolor=#fefefe
| 229917 ||  || — || February 1, 1995 || Kitt Peak || Spacewatch || NYS || align=right | 1.0 km || 
|-id=918 bgcolor=#E9E9E9
| 229918 ||  || — || February 4, 1995 || Kitt Peak || Spacewatch || JUN || align=right | 1.8 km || 
|-id=919 bgcolor=#fefefe
| 229919 ||  || — || March 23, 1995 || Kitt Peak || Spacewatch || NYS || align=right data-sort-value="0.86" | 860 m || 
|-id=920 bgcolor=#fefefe
| 229920 ||  || — || March 29, 1995 || Kitt Peak || Spacewatch || — || align=right | 1.5 km || 
|-id=921 bgcolor=#E9E9E9
| 229921 ||  || — || September 25, 1995 || Kitt Peak || Spacewatch || — || align=right | 2.0 km || 
|-id=922 bgcolor=#E9E9E9
| 229922 ||  || — || September 25, 1995 || Kitt Peak || Spacewatch || — || align=right | 1.9 km || 
|-id=923 bgcolor=#fefefe
| 229923 ||  || — || October 23, 1995 || Kitt Peak || Spacewatch || — || align=right data-sort-value="0.85" | 850 m || 
|-id=924 bgcolor=#E9E9E9
| 229924 ||  || — || October 18, 1995 || Kitt Peak || Spacewatch || — || align=right | 2.0 km || 
|-id=925 bgcolor=#fefefe
| 229925 ||  || — || March 12, 1996 || Kitt Peak || Spacewatch || FLO || align=right | 1.4 km || 
|-id=926 bgcolor=#fefefe
| 229926 ||  || — || March 21, 1996 || Kitt Peak || Spacewatch || NYS || align=right data-sort-value="0.73" | 730 m || 
|-id=927 bgcolor=#E9E9E9
| 229927 ||  || — || October 13, 1996 || Sudbury || D. di Cicco || — || align=right | 3.4 km || 
|-id=928 bgcolor=#E9E9E9
| 229928 ||  || — || January 11, 1997 || Kitt Peak || Spacewatch || — || align=right | 1.8 km || 
|-id=929 bgcolor=#E9E9E9
| 229929 ||  || — || April 8, 1997 || Kitt Peak || Spacewatch || WIT || align=right | 1.2 km || 
|-id=930 bgcolor=#fefefe
| 229930 ||  || — || September 28, 1997 || Kitt Peak || Spacewatch || — || align=right | 1.6 km || 
|-id=931 bgcolor=#d6d6d6
| 229931 ||  || — || September 28, 1997 || Kitt Peak || Spacewatch || THM || align=right | 2.8 km || 
|-id=932 bgcolor=#fefefe
| 229932 ||  || — || October 3, 1997 || Caussols || ODAS || — || align=right | 1.5 km || 
|-id=933 bgcolor=#fefefe
| 229933 ||  || — || October 4, 1997 || Caussols || ODAS || NYS || align=right | 1.0 km || 
|-id=934 bgcolor=#E9E9E9
| 229934 ||  || — || January 23, 1998 || Kitt Peak || Spacewatch || — || align=right | 2.1 km || 
|-id=935 bgcolor=#E9E9E9
| 229935 ||  || — || May 28, 1998 || Kitt Peak || Spacewatch || — || align=right | 3.2 km || 
|-id=936 bgcolor=#fefefe
| 229936 ||  || — || August 17, 1998 || Socorro || LINEAR || V || align=right | 1.0 km || 
|-id=937 bgcolor=#E9E9E9
| 229937 ||  || — || September 12, 1998 || Kitt Peak || Spacewatch || — || align=right | 3.5 km || 
|-id=938 bgcolor=#fefefe
| 229938 ||  || — || September 26, 1998 || Socorro || LINEAR || FLO || align=right data-sort-value="0.92" | 920 m || 
|-id=939 bgcolor=#fefefe
| 229939 ||  || — || September 26, 1998 || Socorro || LINEAR || V || align=right | 1.0 km || 
|-id=940 bgcolor=#fefefe
| 229940 ||  || — || September 26, 1998 || Socorro || LINEAR || NYS || align=right data-sort-value="0.98" | 980 m || 
|-id=941 bgcolor=#fefefe
| 229941 ||  || — || September 26, 1998 || Socorro || LINEAR || FLO || align=right data-sort-value="0.92" | 920 m || 
|-id=942 bgcolor=#d6d6d6
| 229942 ||  || — || September 19, 1998 || Apache Point || SDSS || KOR || align=right | 1.7 km || 
|-id=943 bgcolor=#fefefe
| 229943 || 1998 TH || — || October 10, 1998 || Oizumi || T. Kobayashi || — || align=right | 1.1 km || 
|-id=944 bgcolor=#fefefe
| 229944 || 1998 UW || — || October 17, 1998 || Catalina || CSS || PHO || align=right | 1.7 km || 
|-id=945 bgcolor=#fefefe
| 229945 ||  || — || October 17, 1998 || Xinglong || SCAP || NYS || align=right | 2.1 km || 
|-id=946 bgcolor=#fefefe
| 229946 ||  || — || October 16, 1998 || Kitt Peak || Spacewatch || MAS || align=right data-sort-value="0.76" | 760 m || 
|-id=947 bgcolor=#fefefe
| 229947 ||  || — || November 14, 1998 || Kitt Peak || Spacewatch || NYS || align=right data-sort-value="0.96" | 960 m || 
|-id=948 bgcolor=#fefefe
| 229948 ||  || — || November 21, 1998 || Socorro || LINEAR || — || align=right | 1.3 km || 
|-id=949 bgcolor=#d6d6d6
| 229949 ||  || — || November 16, 1998 || Kitt Peak || Spacewatch || — || align=right | 3.5 km || 
|-id=950 bgcolor=#fefefe
| 229950 ||  || — || December 12, 1998 || Farra d'Isonzo || Farra d'Isonzo || V || align=right | 1.1 km || 
|-id=951 bgcolor=#d6d6d6
| 229951 ||  || — || December 10, 1998 || Kitt Peak || Spacewatch || HYG || align=right | 4.0 km || 
|-id=952 bgcolor=#fefefe
| 229952 ||  || — || December 13, 1998 || Kitt Peak || Spacewatch || — || align=right | 2.2 km || 
|-id=953 bgcolor=#d6d6d6
| 229953 ||  || — || December 22, 1998 || Kitt Peak || Spacewatch || — || align=right | 3.1 km || 
|-id=954 bgcolor=#d6d6d6
| 229954 ||  || — || January 19, 1999 || Caussols || ODAS || — || align=right | 6.0 km || 
|-id=955 bgcolor=#d6d6d6
| 229955 ||  || — || January 19, 1999 || Kitt Peak || Spacewatch || THM || align=right | 2.7 km || 
|-id=956 bgcolor=#d6d6d6
| 229956 ||  || — || February 12, 1999 || Socorro || LINEAR || — || align=right | 5.5 km || 
|-id=957 bgcolor=#E9E9E9
| 229957 ||  || — || May 17, 1999 || Socorro || LINEAR || BRG || align=right | 2.4 km || 
|-id=958 bgcolor=#FA8072
| 229958 ||  || — || September 13, 1999 || Siding Spring || R. H. McNaught || — || align=right data-sort-value="0.99" | 990 m || 
|-id=959 bgcolor=#d6d6d6
| 229959 ||  || — || September 9, 1999 || Socorro || LINEAR || — || align=right | 3.8 km || 
|-id=960 bgcolor=#E9E9E9
| 229960 ||  || — || September 7, 1999 || Anderson Mesa || LONEOS || GEF || align=right | 2.3 km || 
|-id=961 bgcolor=#E9E9E9
| 229961 ||  || — || October 12, 1999 || Prescott || P. G. Comba || — || align=right | 4.3 km || 
|-id=962 bgcolor=#fefefe
| 229962 ||  || — || October 4, 1999 || Socorro || LINEAR || — || align=right data-sort-value="0.70" | 700 m || 
|-id=963 bgcolor=#E9E9E9
| 229963 ||  || — || October 7, 1999 || Socorro || LINEAR || — || align=right | 3.9 km || 
|-id=964 bgcolor=#E9E9E9
| 229964 ||  || — || October 7, 1999 || Socorro || LINEAR || NEM || align=right | 3.4 km || 
|-id=965 bgcolor=#E9E9E9
| 229965 ||  || — || October 12, 1999 || Socorro || LINEAR || GEF || align=right | 1.8 km || 
|-id=966 bgcolor=#fefefe
| 229966 ||  || — || October 13, 1999 || Socorro || LINEAR || — || align=right data-sort-value="0.93" | 930 m || 
|-id=967 bgcolor=#d6d6d6
| 229967 ||  || — || October 2, 1999 || Catalina || CSS || — || align=right | 4.2 km || 
|-id=968 bgcolor=#E9E9E9
| 229968 ||  || — || October 3, 1999 || Catalina || CSS || — || align=right | 2.6 km || 
|-id=969 bgcolor=#E9E9E9
| 229969 ||  || — || October 9, 1999 || Catalina || CSS || — || align=right | 4.1 km || 
|-id=970 bgcolor=#E9E9E9
| 229970 ||  || — || October 9, 1999 || Catalina || CSS || — || align=right | 4.0 km || 
|-id=971 bgcolor=#E9E9E9
| 229971 ||  || — || October 29, 1999 || Kitt Peak || Spacewatch || HOF || align=right | 2.7 km || 
|-id=972 bgcolor=#E9E9E9
| 229972 ||  || — || October 29, 1999 || Catalina || CSS || — || align=right | 3.2 km || 
|-id=973 bgcolor=#E9E9E9
| 229973 ||  || — || October 30, 1999 || Catalina || CSS || DOR || align=right | 3.6 km || 
|-id=974 bgcolor=#E9E9E9
| 229974 ||  || — || October 16, 1999 || Kitt Peak || Spacewatch || — || align=right | 2.4 km || 
|-id=975 bgcolor=#E9E9E9
| 229975 ||  || — || November 12, 1999 || Bergisch Gladbach || W. Bickel || — || align=right | 2.9 km || 
|-id=976 bgcolor=#E9E9E9
| 229976 ||  || — || November 4, 1999 || Socorro || LINEAR || — || align=right | 2.9 km || 
|-id=977 bgcolor=#E9E9E9
| 229977 ||  || — || November 4, 1999 || Socorro || LINEAR || AGN || align=right | 1.7 km || 
|-id=978 bgcolor=#E9E9E9
| 229978 ||  || — || November 3, 1999 || Kitt Peak || Spacewatch || HOF || align=right | 2.6 km || 
|-id=979 bgcolor=#E9E9E9
| 229979 ||  || — || November 11, 1999 || Kitt Peak || Spacewatch || NEM || align=right | 2.9 km || 
|-id=980 bgcolor=#d6d6d6
| 229980 ||  || — || November 10, 1999 || Kitt Peak || Spacewatch || KOR || align=right | 1.7 km || 
|-id=981 bgcolor=#d6d6d6
| 229981 ||  || — || November 9, 1999 || Socorro || LINEAR || — || align=right | 2.4 km || 
|-id=982 bgcolor=#E9E9E9
| 229982 ||  || — || November 30, 1999 || Kitt Peak || Spacewatch || — || align=right | 4.3 km || 
|-id=983 bgcolor=#E9E9E9
| 229983 ||  || — || November 17, 1999 || Kitt Peak || Spacewatch || HNA || align=right | 3.0 km || 
|-id=984 bgcolor=#d6d6d6
| 229984 ||  || — || December 7, 1999 || Socorro || LINEAR || — || align=right | 2.7 km || 
|-id=985 bgcolor=#fefefe
| 229985 ||  || — || December 7, 1999 || Socorro || LINEAR || FLO || align=right data-sort-value="0.96" | 960 m || 
|-id=986 bgcolor=#FA8072
| 229986 ||  || — || December 7, 1999 || Catalina || CSS || — || align=right data-sort-value="0.94" | 940 m || 
|-id=987 bgcolor=#d6d6d6
| 229987 ||  || — || December 12, 1999 || Socorro || LINEAR || YAK || align=right | 2.5 km || 
|-id=988 bgcolor=#fefefe
| 229988 ||  || — || December 13, 1999 || Kitt Peak || Spacewatch || — || align=right data-sort-value="0.99" | 990 m || 
|-id=989 bgcolor=#fefefe
| 229989 ||  || — || December 16, 1999 || Kitt Peak || Spacewatch || — || align=right | 1.1 km || 
|-id=990 bgcolor=#E9E9E9
| 229990 ||  || — || December 31, 1999 || Kitt Peak || Spacewatch || — || align=right | 4.1 km || 
|-id=991 bgcolor=#fefefe
| 229991 ||  || — || January 3, 2000 || Kitt Peak || Spacewatch || — || align=right | 1.2 km || 
|-id=992 bgcolor=#d6d6d6
| 229992 ||  || — || January 4, 2000 || Kitt Peak || Spacewatch || EOS || align=right | 2.7 km || 
|-id=993 bgcolor=#fefefe
| 229993 ||  || — || January 8, 2000 || Kitt Peak || Spacewatch || FLO || align=right | 1.6 km || 
|-id=994 bgcolor=#d6d6d6
| 229994 ||  || — || January 26, 2000 || Kitt Peak || Spacewatch || KOR || align=right | 2.0 km || 
|-id=995 bgcolor=#fefefe
| 229995 ||  || — || February 2, 2000 || Socorro || LINEAR || — || align=right data-sort-value="0.94" | 940 m || 
|-id=996 bgcolor=#fefefe
| 229996 ||  || — || February 2, 2000 || Socorro || LINEAR || — || align=right | 1.1 km || 
|-id=997 bgcolor=#d6d6d6
| 229997 ||  || — || February 8, 2000 || Kitt Peak || Spacewatch || — || align=right | 3.0 km || 
|-id=998 bgcolor=#C2FFFF
| 229998 ||  || — || February 5, 2000 || Kitt Peak || M. W. Buie || L4 || align=right | 13 km || 
|-id=999 bgcolor=#fefefe
| 229999 ||  || — || February 29, 2000 || Socorro || LINEAR || NYS || align=right | 1.4 km || 
|-id=000 bgcolor=#fefefe
| 230000 ||  || — || February 29, 2000 || Socorro || LINEAR || — || align=right | 1.3 km || 
|}

References

External links 
 Discovery Circumstances: Numbered Minor Planets (225001)–(230000) (IAU Minor Planet Center)

0229